= Genevieve H. Sanford =

American clubwoman (1883–1966)

- Sanford in 1925
- Born: Genevieve Hillen; May 26, 1883; Peoria, Illinois
- Died: August 15, 1966 (aged 83); Sacramento, California
- Other name: Mrs. George Sanford
- Occupation: Clubwoman

Genevieve Hillen Sanford (May 26, 1883 – August 15, 1966) was a clubwoman and philanthropist active in civic affairs.

== Personal life ==
Genevieve Hillen was born in Peoria, Illinois, on May 26, 1883, the daughter of Robert G. and Anna J. Hillen.

She married George Brownell Sanford.

The Sanfords moved to Washington state in 1926 and lived in Aberdeen. They then spent several years in Rio de Janeiro, Brazil, before returning to Sacramento.

== Career ==
Sanford was president of Tuesday Club, Sacramento, California, a literary and philanthropic club for women. The club became increasingly political, and was an important local center for women's organizing and advocacy efforts. She also served for many years as president of the Allied Arts Breakfast Club, and as president of the Sacramento chapter of the National League of American Pen Women.

For many years, Sanford was a member of the Ann Land Memorial Fund Commission, appointed by the Sacramento City Council. The bequest of the Ann Land Memorial Fund required the funds be invested by the City Treasurer and the proceeds paid out, under supervision of the City Council, to the benefit of destitute men, women and children of the city.

She was intensely interested in philanthropy and was the chairman of the Red Cross Home Service, Aberdeen.

When she lived in Washington, she was a member of the Woman's Century Club in Seattle and the Review Club. She established the Grays Harbor Women's Club which quickly attracted 350 members. In Rio de Janeiro she was president of that city's women's club.

== Death ==
She died in Sacramento on August 15, 1966, and is buried at the East Lawn Memorial Park.
