= Language bank =

A language bank is an organization that helps people who need translation or interpretation services fulfill those needs through the assistance of qualified translators or interpreters. Such organizations usually, but not always, provide such services free of charge, often as a service of local government. Language banks often service immigrant or refugee communities, often in collaboration with health service providers such as the American Red Cross.

Various sorts of businesses also manage internal language service needs by setting up language banks. Often, employees with language skills may donate a part of their work time to participating in language banks.

In this circumstance it may be referred to as an "Employee Language Bank."
