= English Evangelical Lutheran Church of Dansville =

Historic church in New York, United States

- U.S. National Register of Historic Places
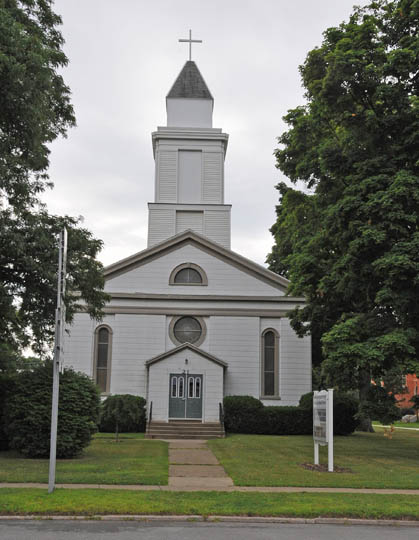
- Saint Paul's Lutheran Church, January 2008

- Location within New York Location within the United States
- Location: 21 Clara Barton St., Dansville, New York
- Coordinates: 42°33′31″N 77°41′52″W
- Area: Less than 1 acre (0.40 ha)
- Built: 1847
- Architectural style: Greek Revival
- NRHP reference No.: 13000448
- Added to NRHP: June 25, 2013

English Evangelical Lutheran Church of Dansville, also known as Saint Paul's Lutheran Church, is a historic Lutheran church located at Dansville in Livingston County, New York. It was built in 1847, and is a one-story, late Greek Revival style frame church. It has a front gable roof with a wide frieze and features rounded arched windows and a two-tiered steeple. An education wing was added in 1924 and expanded in the 1950s, and a projecting entrance was added in 1947. It was the church where Clara Barton founded the first local chapter of the American Red Cross in 1881.

It was listed on the National Register of Historic Places in 2013.
