= A Touch of Home: The Vietnam War's Red Cross Girls =

2007 American documentary film

- Directed by: Patrick and Cheryl Fries
- Produced by: Patrick and Cheryl Fries
- Release date: April 21, 2007 (USA)
- Country: United States

A Touch of Home: The Vietnam War's Red Cross Girls is an American documentary film produced and directed by Patrick and Cheryl Fries. The film tells the story of 627 young American women who served in the American Red Cross Supplemental Recreation Overseas Program during the Vietnam War. It was screened in Dallas, Texas on April 21, 2007.

== Subject matter ==
The Vietnam War Red Cross "Donut Dollies" were young, college-degreed women who spent a one-year tour in country as morale boosters for American troops. They ran recreation centers, visited hospitals, and, because of the mobility of the UH-1 Iroquois helicopter, traveled to front-line landing zones and base camps to bring games and smiles to soldiers. Many chose to join the program because of President John F. Kennedy, who encouraged young people to serve the country.

== Content ==
The film producers expanded on a brief segment about Vietnam Donut Dollies in their previous production In the Shadow of the Blade with A Touch of Home. The film includes interviews with veterans of the program and follows them as they reflect on their experience during a reunion at the Vietnam Veterans Memorial State Park in Angel Fire, New Mexico. Much of the documentary includes unique wartime photographs and home movies captured by the Donut Dollies during their tours.

== Awards and recognitions ==
The documentary won Best Short Documentary in the 2009 GI Film Festival.
