= Disaster Action Team =

Local unit of the American Red Cross

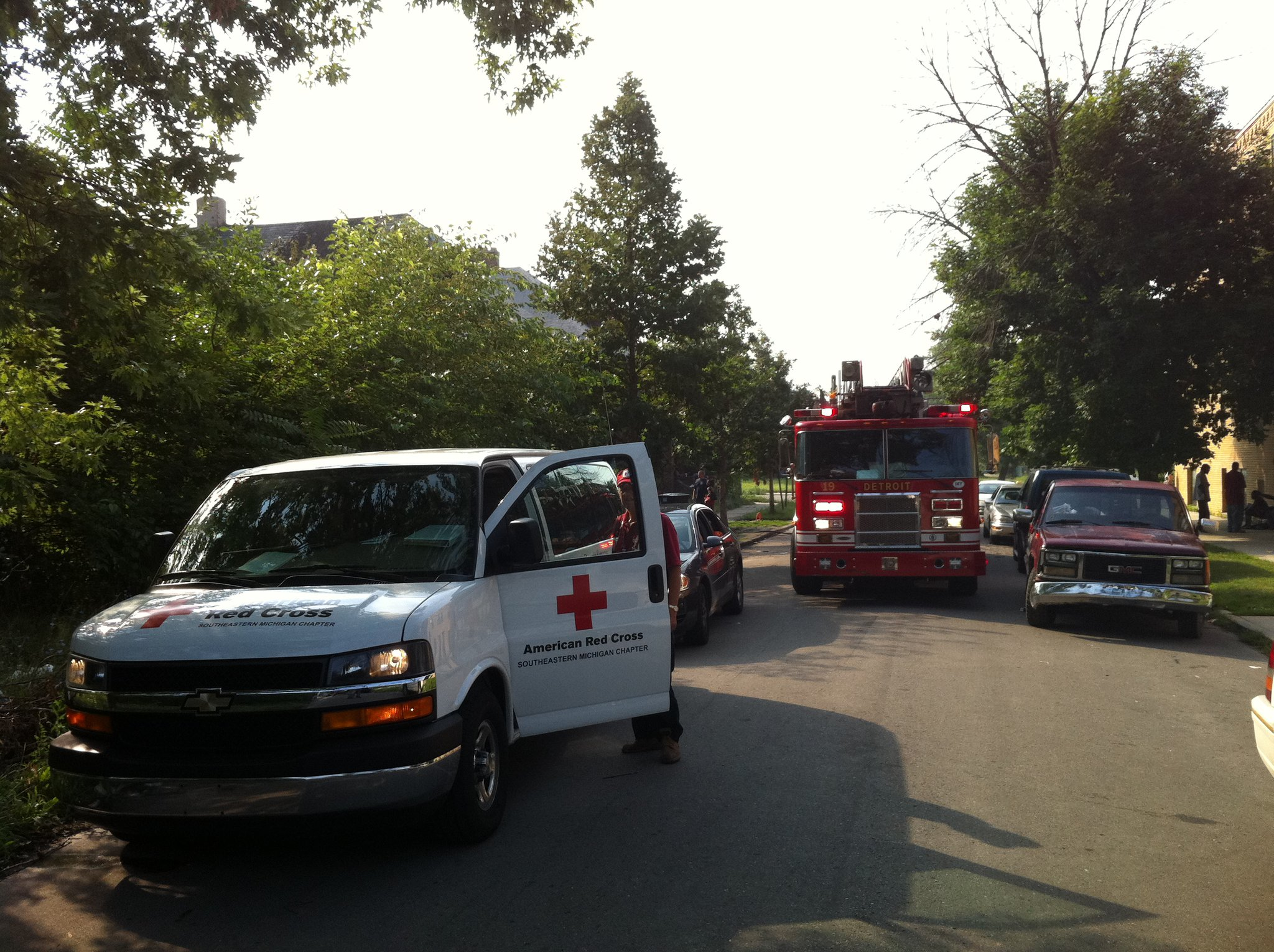
An American Red Cross Disaster Action Team responding to a house fire in Detroit, Michigan

A Disaster Action Team is the local disaster response unit in chapters of the American Red Cross.

American Red Cross chapters have Disaster Action Teams (commonly called "DATs"), which provide disaster relief services on an on-call basis. They may provide free emergency food, clothing and shelter assistance, and assist disaster victims in planning their immediate and long-term recovery from disaster.

The teams are composed of American Red Cross Disaster Services volunteers who have received training in disaster assessment, client casework and other skills. Many larger chapters in metropolitan areas have multiple Disaster Action Teams on call at any given time to respond to disasters in their communities.

Disaster Action Teams do not commonly respond to disasters outside their chapter's area of responsibility, which are managed by the American Red Cross's national Disaster Services Human Resources system.
