= Gail J. McGovern =

President of the American Red Cross

Gail McGovern
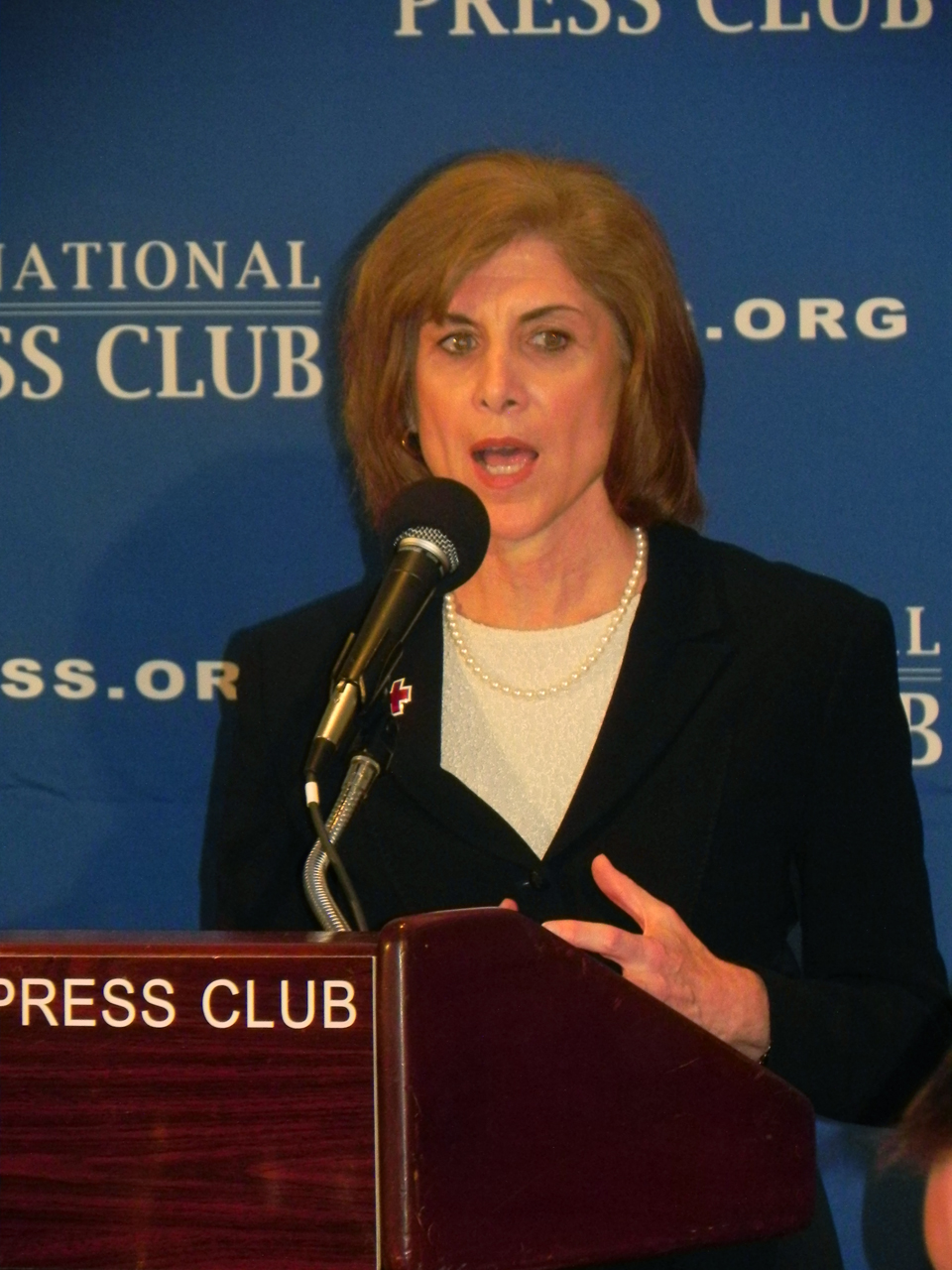

Chairman of the Board of Governors American Red Cross
- Incumbent
- Assumed office July 1, 2024
- Preceded by: Bonnie McElveen-Hunter

President of the American Red Cross
- In office June 23, 2008 – June 30, 2024
- Preceded by: Mark W. Everson
- Succeeded by: Clifford S. Holtz

Personal details
- Born: January 12, 1952 (age 74) Springfield, New Jersey, U.S
- Education: Johns Hopkins University (BA); Columbia University (MBA)

Gail J. McGovern (born 1952) is an American businessperson, who became president and CEO of the American Red Cross on June 23, 2008. McGovern held top management positions at AT&T Corporation and Fidelity Investments. She is a member of the board of trustees of Johns Hopkins University and the board of directors of DTE Energy.

== Early life ==
Born in 1952 and raised as Gail J. Rosenberg in Springfield, New Jersey. She received a Bachelor of Arts degree in quantitative sciences from Johns Hopkins University in 1974 and an MBA from Columbia Business School in 1987.

== Career ==
She began at AT&T Corporation as a programmer also working in sales, marketing and management. Eventually she became the executive vice president of the consumer markets division, the largest business unit, responsible for $26 billion in residential long-distance service. She held this role from 1997 to 1998.

She joined Fidelity Investments in September 1998 as president of distribution and services. Her department served 4 million customers with $500 billion in assets.

She was recognized by Fortune magazine in 2000 and 2001 as one of the top 50 most powerful women in corporate America.

She joined the faculty of the Harvard Business School in June 2002 where she taught marketing and consumer marketing to first and second year students. McGovern was an adjunct faculty of the Harvard Business School.

=== American Red Cross ===
She assumed the role of president and CEO of the American Red Cross on June 23, 2008, replacing Mark W. Everson, a former IRS commissioner and becoming the seventh chief in seven years. In June she joined a delegation of 30 community leaders organized by the United States Agency for International Development to visit China and those affected by the 2008 Sichuan earthquake.

McGovern, was the longest-serving CEO of the American Red Cross since its founder Clara Barton, and played a pivotal role in transforming the organization. As President and CEO, she led initiatives that modernized the Red Cross, improved financial stability, and expanded the reach of lifesaving services. Her accomplishments include eliminating a $209 million annual operating deficit, launching resiliency programs for military families, and implementing cutting-edge digital disaster information systems. Additionally, she oversaw the distribution of convalescent plasma during the COVID-19 pandemic and initiated efforts to address the impact of the climate crisis on disaster response. McGovern’s leadership has been instrumental in ensuring the Red Cross remains prepared to fulfill its vital humanitarian mission.

In October 2023, it was announced that McGovern would retire as president and CEO on June 30, 2024.

On July 1, 2024 McGovern became Chairman of the Board of Governors of the American Red Cross. In this role as Chairman, Gail guides the Board in overseeing and governing Red Cross operations.

== Honors and awards ==
On May 27, 2020, McGovern was invited to and gave special remarks at her alma mater Johns Hopkins University's 2020 Commencement ceremony. Other notable guest speakers during the virtual ceremony included Reddit co-founder and Commencement speaker Alexis Ohanian; philanthropist and former New York City Mayor, Michael Bloomberg; Anthony Fauci, director of the National Institute of Allergy and Infectious Diseases and later leading member of the White House Coronavirus Task Force; and senior class president Pavan Patel.

McGovern was selected for the inaugural 2021 Forbes 50 Over 50; made up of entrepreneurs, leaders, scientists and creators who are over the age of 50.

On May 21, 2026, McGovern was awarded the honorary degree of Doctor of Humane Letters (DHL) by Johns Hopkins University, alongside Nobel laureate Katalin Karikó, journalist Wolf Blitzer, ecologist Simon A. Levin, artist Amy Sherald, and oncologist Bert Vogelstein.

== Personal ==
She currently resides in Washington, D.C., with her husband, Donald E. McGovern. She has three children and two grandchildren.
