= Inez Mee Boren =

20th-century American socialite

- Born: November 2, 1880; San Bernardino, California, U.S.
- Died: December 28, 1947 (aged 67); Stockton, California, U.S.
- Occupations: Socialite, civic leader
- Organizations: League of Women Voters, American Red Cross, Oakland Civic Center
- Known for: Director of the Woman's City Club of Oakland
- Spouse: Frank H. Boren
- Children: 1

Inez Mee Boren (November 2, 1880 – December 28, 1947) was an American socialite. She was the director of the Woman's City Club of Oakland.

== Early life ==
Inez Mee Boren was born in San Bernardino, California, on November 2, 1880, the daughter of John Joseph Mee (1854-1933) and Rainey Corbue (1857-1911). John J. Mee was born in a covered wagon somewhere after Utah to Eliza Hunt (1821-1876) and John Sidney Mee Sr. (1815-1876), pioneers of California.

== Career ==
She was active in club and civic affairs. She held important offices in various women's organizations. From 1920 to 1921 she was the president of Oakland Civic Center. In 1924 she was president of the Northern (California) Section of the League of Women Voters. In 1926 she organized the Study and Research Department of the Oakland Forum. She was the organizing chairman of the Lindsay Strathmore Branch of the American Red Cross. From 1927 to 1928 she was the director of the Woman's City Club of Oakland. She was secretary and director of the Building Company of the Woman's City Club of Oakland.

She was a member of the Oakland Forum and the Rock Ridge Women's Club.

== Personal life ==
Inez Mee Boren was a life-long resident of California and lived at 245 Grand Blvd., San Mateo, California. On August 15, 1903, she married Frank H. Boren, superintendent of San Mateo Union High School and Junior College District, and had one son, Raitt S. Boren.

Boren died on December 28, 1947 in Stockton, California.
