= General Federation of Women's Clubs =

Federation of women's civic clubs in the U.S.

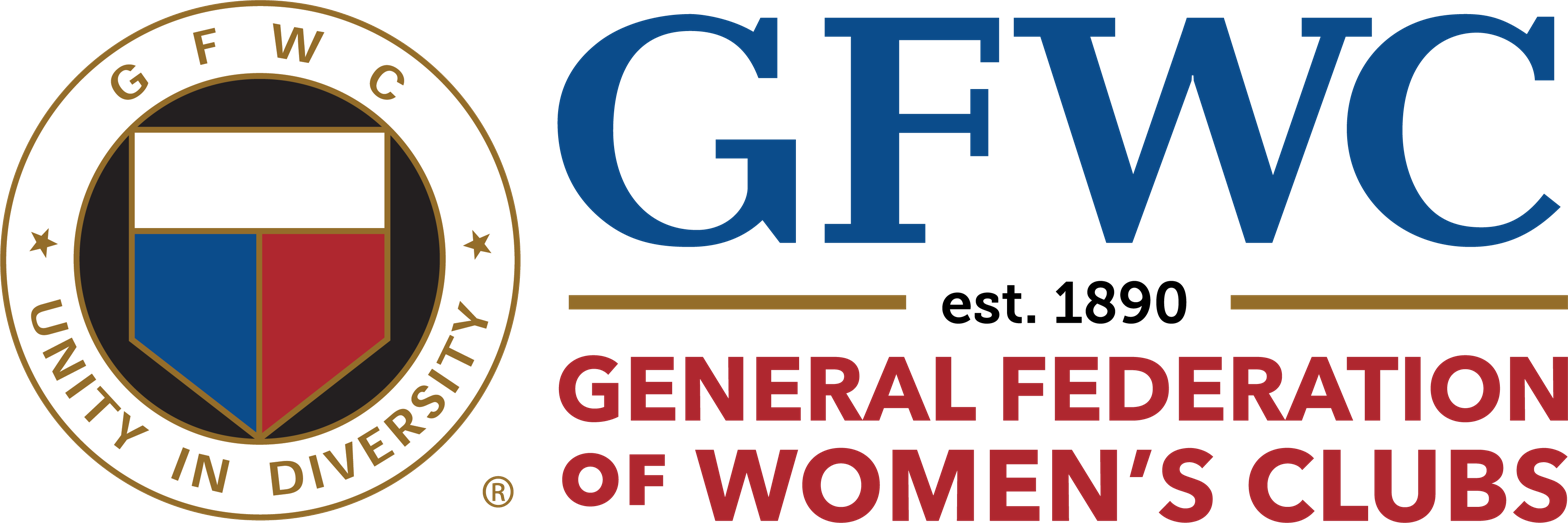
- Founded: 1890
- Headquarters: General Federation of Women's Clubs Headquarters; 1734 N Street NW; Washington, D.C.
- Website: gfwc.org

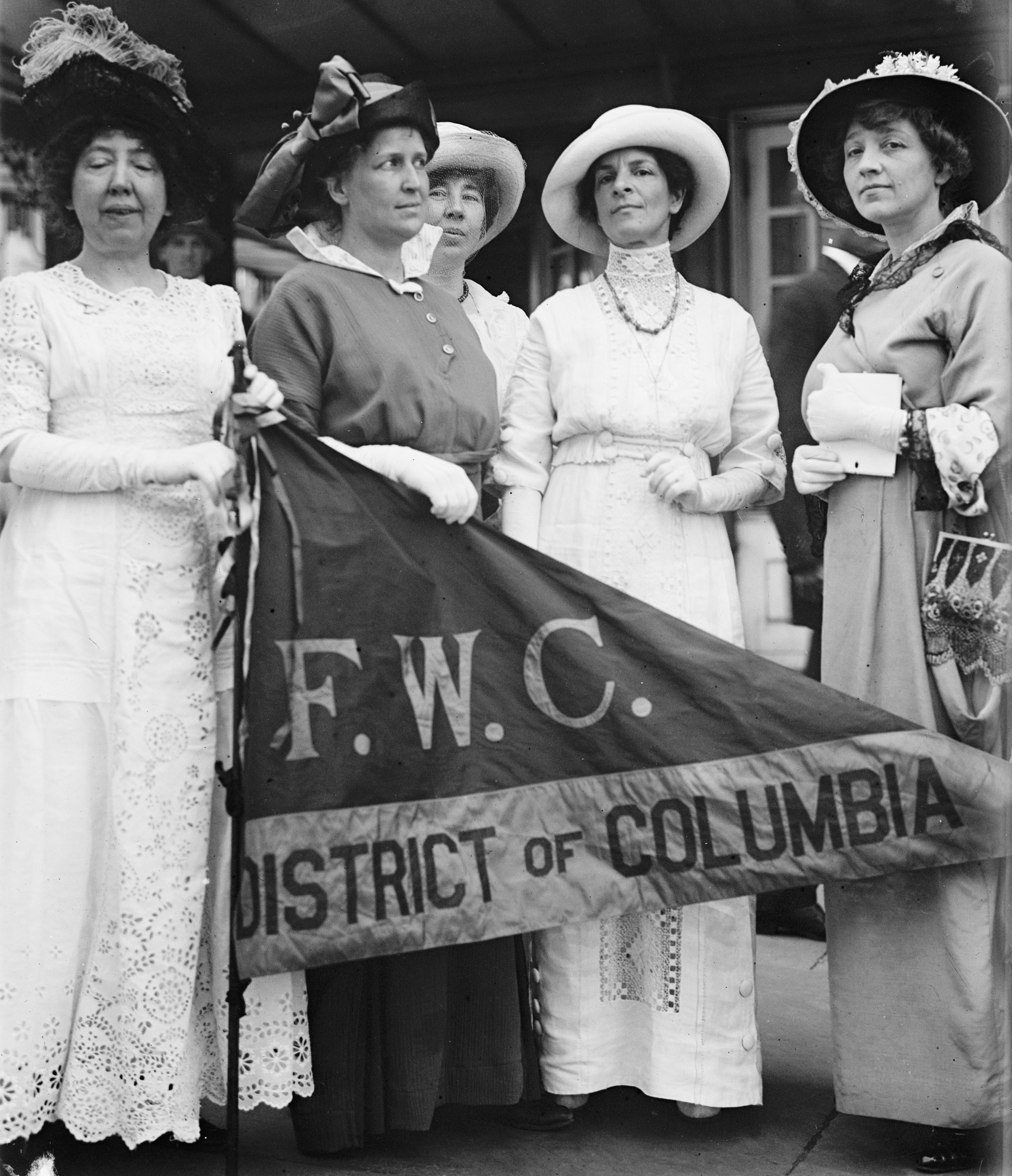
Federation Of Women's Clubs, D.C. Leaders Of Delegation To White House, 1914: Mrs. Ellis Logan; Mrs. H.W. Wiley; Miss E. Shippen; Mrs. R.C. Darr; Miss M. McNeilan

General Federation of Women's Clubs pamphlet on roadside beautification and billboard restriction.

The General Federation of Women's Clubs (GFWC), founded in 1890 during the Progressive Movement, is a federation of approximately 2,300 women's clubs in the United States which promote civic improvements through volunteer service. Community Service Projects (CSP) are organized by local clubs for the benefit of their communities or GFWC's Affiliate Organization (AO) partnerships. GFWC maintains nearly 60,000 members throughout the United States and internationally. GFWC is one of the world's largest and oldest nonpartisan, nondenominational, women's volunteer service organizations. The GFWC headquarters is located in Washington, D.C.

== History ==
The GFWC was founded by Jane Cunningham Croly, a leading New York journalist. In 1868 she helped found the Sorosis club for professional women. It was the model for the nationwide GFWC in 1890.

In 1889, Croly organized a conference in New York that brought together delegates from 61 women's clubs. The women formed a permanent organization in 1890 with Charlotte Emerson Brown as its first president. In 1901 it was granted a charter by Congress. Dietz proclaimed, "We look for unity, but unity in diversity" and that became the GFWC motto. Southern white women played a central role in the early years.

Local women's clubs initially joined the General Federation directly but later came into membership through state federations that began forming in 1892. The GFWC also counts international clubs among its members.

In 1900, the GFWC met in Milwaukee, and Josephine Ruffin, a black journalist, tried to attend as a representative of three Boston organizations – the New Era Club, the New England Woman's Club and the New England Woman's Press Club. Southern women led by president Rebecca Douglas Lowe, a Georgia native, told Ruffin that she could be seated as an honorary representative of the two white clubs but would not seat a black club. She refused on principle and was excluded from the proceedings. These events became known as "The Ruffin Incident" and were widely covered in newspapers around the country, most of whom supported Ruffin.

In a time when women's rights were limited, the state federation chapters held grassroots efforts to make sure the woman's voice was heard. Through monthly group meetings to annual charter meetings, women of influential status within their communities could have their feelings heard. They were able to meet with state officials in order to have a say in community events. Until the right to vote was granted, these women's clubs were the best outlet for women to be heard and taken seriously.

Women's clubs spread very rapidly after 1890, taking up some of the slack left by the decline of the WCTU and the temperance movement. Local clubs at first were mostly reading groups focused on literature, but increasingly became civic improvement organizations of middle-class women meeting in each other's homes weekly. The clubs avoided controversial issues that would divide the membership, especially religion and the prohibition issue. In the south and east, suffrage was also highly divisive, while there was little resistance to it among clubwomen in the west. In the midwest, clubwomen first avoided the suffrage issue out of caution, but after 1900 increasingly came to support it.

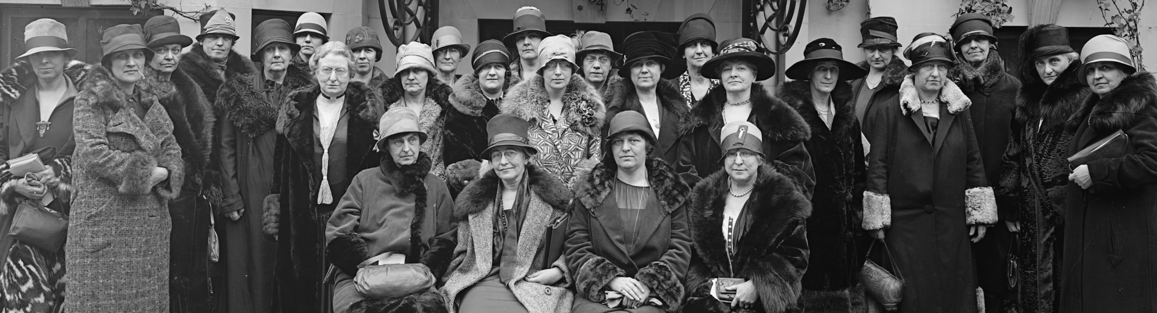
GFWC clubwomen outside N Street headquarters, Washington DC, ca.1920s

== Representative activities ==
Historian Paige Meltzer puts the GFWC in the context of the Progressive Movement, arguing that its policies:

built on Progressive-era strategies of municipal housekeeping. During the Progressive era, female activists used traditional constructions of womanhood, which imagined all women as mothers and homemakers, to justify their entrance into community affairs: as "municipal housekeepers," they would clean up politics, cities, and see after the health and wellbeing of their neighbors. Donning the mantle of motherhood, female activists methodically investigated their community's needs and used their "maternal" expertise to lobby, create, and secure a place for themselves in an emerging state welfare bureaucracy, best illustrated perhaps by clubwoman Julia Lathrop's leadership in the US Children's Bureau. As part of this tradition of maternal activism, the Progressive-era General Federation supported a range of causes from the pure food and drug administration to public health care for mothers and children to a ban on child labor, each of which looked to the state to help implement their vision of social justice.

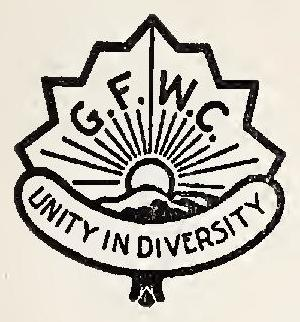
General Federation of Women's Clubs logo in 1902

Kansas was a representative state, as the women's clubs joined with local chapters of the WCTU and other organizations to deal with social issues. The clubs continued to feature discussions of current literature, culture, and civic events, but they also broadened to include public schools, local parks, sanitation, prostitution, and protection of children.

Paula Watson has shown that across the country the clubs supported the local Carnegie public library, as well as traveling libraries for rural areas. They promoted state legislation to fund and support libraries, especially to form library extension programs. GFWC affiliates worked with the American Library Association, state library associations, and state library commissions and gave critical support to library education programs at the universities.

Many clubs were especially concerned with uplifting the neglected status of American Indians. They brought John Collier into the forefront of the debate when they appointed him the research agent for the Indian Welfare Committee in 1922. The GFWC took a leadership role in opposing assimilation policies, supporting the return of Indian lands, and promoting more religious and economic independence. For example, southwestern clubs help support the Museum of Northern Arizona (MNA) and became advocates and consumers for authentic Native American arts and crafts. Even more important, in western states, GFWC affiliates cooperated with Collier when he served (1933–45) as the New Deal's Commissioner for Indian affairs in his campaign to reverse federal policies designed to assimilate Indians into the national culture.

In May 1925 Edith Brake West conducted a survey of county organizations which was recognized by the National Federation of Women's Clubs. For the first time in the history of federated clubs, the accomplishments and the organization of these bodies were set forth.

The membership reached 800,000 in 1955, and has declined to about 70,000 in the 21st century as middle-class women moved into the public mainstream. During the Cold War era, the GFWC promoted the theme that American women had a unique ability to preserve world peace while strengthening the nation internally through local, national, and international community activism. The remaining 70,000 members are older now, and have less influence in national affairs. The affiliated clubs in every state and more than a dozen countries work locally "to support the arts, preserve natural resources, advance education, promote healthy lifestyles, encourage civic involvement, and work toward world peace and understanding".

In 2009, GFWC members raised over $39 million on behalf of more than 110,000 projects, and volunteered more than 4.1 million hours in the communities where they live and work.

== Notable clubwomen ==
- Annette Abbott Adams, chairman of Legislation, California Federation of Women's Clubs
- Jane Addams (1860–1935)
- Effie Adelaide Payne Austin, State Trustee of the California Federation of Women's Clubs
- Edith Vosburgh Alvord (1875–1962)
- Helen Bagg, for several years served as chairman of Literature for Illinois Federation of Women's Clubs
- Mrs. L. Dow Balliett (1847–1929), helped select the organization's "little blue pin"
- Alice Barnett, Southern District chairman, California Federation of Women's Clubs, for Motion Pictures; local chairman of Motion Pictures; president of San Bernardino Women's Club
- Annie Little Barry, Served for many years as State Parliamentarian of the California Federation of Women's Clubs
- Mary Lathrop Benton, Federation of Women's Clubs
- Mariana Bertola, General Federation Director and President of the California Federation of Women's Clubs
- Edythe Mitchell Bissell, President, San Luis Obispo County Federation of Women's Clubs
- Fannie Jean Black, chairman of the Press Department of the California Federation of Women's clubs
- C. Louise Boehringer, Arizona Federation
- Harriet Bossnot, first vicepresident of the Montana Federation of Women's Clubs
- Leah Belle Kepner Boyce, Press Chairman of California Federation of Women's Clubs, Member Western Federation of Women's Clubs
- Esto Bates Broughton, State chairman of California Federation of Women's Clubs
- Clementine Cordelia Berry Buchwalter (1843–1912)
- Dorothea Dutcher Buck (1887–1986), president of the GFWC 1947–1950
- Clara Bradley Burdette, First president of California Federation of Women's Clubs
- Nellie T. Bush, member of State Legislative Commission, Federation of Women's Clubs
- Mary Ryerson Butin, district chairman of Public Welfare, for California Federation of Women's Clubs
- Grace Richardson Butterfield, President, City and County Federation of Women's Clubs of San Francisco, State and District chairman of Junior membership, California Federation of Women's Clubs
- Vera McKenna Clayton, Santa Cruz Woman's Club
- Elizabeth Bender Roe Cloud (Ojibwe name: Equay Zaince) (1887 – 1965), Ojibwe from the White Earth Reservation, first Native American national chair of Indian Welfare Committee.
- R. Belle Colver, Woman's Club of Spokane
- Ione Virginia Hill Cowles (1858–1940), eighth president, GFWC; president, California Fed. Women's Clubs
- Inez Mabel Crawford, First president of Ottawa Federation of Women's Clubs
- Jane Cunningham Croly (1829–1901)
- Katherine Davis Cumberson, member of State Executive Board, California Fed. Women's Clubs, for 6 years chairman of its Committee of International Relations, founder and honorary president Lake County Fed. Women's Clubs
- Ellen Curtis Demorest (1824–1898)
- Nina F. Diefenbach, Ventura County Federation of Women's Clubs
- Dimies T. Stocking Denison, president of the General Federation of Women's Clubs in 1902, clubwoman and businesswoman
- Sophia Julia Coleman Douglas, founder and first president of the Federation of Women's Clubs for Oklahoma and Indian Territories (1898)
- Saidie Orr Dunbar, Oregon State and National Organization of Women's Clubs, elected President of the (National) General Federation of Women's Clubs (GFWC) in 1938
- Mary Elizabeth Downey (1872–1949)
- Freda Ehmann, Active in Women's Clubs affairs
- Augusta Louise Eraser, president, San Diego County Federation of Women's Clubs
- Oda Faulconer, State Chairman of American Citizenship of the California Federation of Women's Clubs
- Harrye R. P. Smith Forbes, For twelve years was State or District Chairman of California History and Landmarks Dept. for California Federation of Women's Clubs
- Abigail Keasey Frankel, President of the State Federation of Women's Clubs. She was member of the Board of the Missouri Federation of Women's Clubs and President of the 8th District of the Missouri Federation. She was the President of the Portland Woman's Club and the chairman of the finance of the Woman's Building association
- Lizzie Crozier French (1851–1926)
- Laura E. Frenger, organized the State (New Mexico) Federation of Women's Clubs
- Thora B. Gardiner, President of the Oregon City Women's Club
- Anna Boley Garner, served 6 years on State Board of Federation of Women's Clubs
- Mary E. Gartin, President of Stanislaus County Federation of Women's Clubs; for 3 years president of Modesto Woman's Club
- Mabel Barnett Gates, in 1915 Gates represented Ebell Club at the 14th annual California Federation of Women's Club in San Francisco
- Dale Pickett Gay, President of Wyoming Federation of Women's Clubs and she was active in all club work
- Esther Rainbolt Goodrich, served in many offices in California Federation of Women's Clubs
- Annie Sawyer Green, President, California Federation of Women's Clubs, Has held several high offices in Federation of Women's Clubs
- Harriet A. Haas, On Speakers' Bureau of County Federation of Women's Clubs and Community Chest
- Sharlot Mabridth Hall, Women's Clubs of Arizona
- Ceil Doyle Hamilton, president of City and County Federation of Women's Clubs of San Francisco
- Susie Prentice Hartzell, secretary of San Joaquin Valley District Federation of Women's Clubs
- Fanny G. Hazlett, in 1932 was presented with a certificate by the General Federation of Women's Club for being the oldest American born mother in the state of Nevada
- Maude B. Helmond, For six years was Child Welfare Chairman for Federated Women's Clubs of Alameda District during which time she was instrumental in establishing Well Baby Clinics in the schools
- Una B. Herrick, Member
- Ada Waite Hildreth, San Diego County and Southern District Chairman, Indian welfare, California Federation of Women's Clubs, Second Vice-President, San Diego County Federation of Women's Clubs
- Etha Izora Dawley Holden, From 1925–27, auditor of California Federation of Women's Clubs
- Dorothy D. Houghton (1890–1972)
- Julia Ward Howe (1819–1910)
- Grace Youmans Hudson, Chairman of Community Service, Los Angeles District, California Federation of Women's Clubs, Member Women's Club of South Pasadena
- Jane Denio Hutchison, president of Tri County Federation of Women's Clubs, Auditor, Northern District Federation of Women's Clubs
- Vernettie O. Ivy, president, Central Arizona District Federation of Women's Clubs
- Christine A. Jacobsen, Council of International Relations, California Federation of Women's Clubs
- Lotta Hetler James, chairman Child Welfare, San Joaquin Valley and State Fed. Women's Clubs, chairman, Resolution Committee, State Fed. Women's Clubs
- Kate Wetzel Jameson, member
- May Mann Jennings (1872–1963)
- Ella Bond Johnston (1860-1951), chair of the GFWC art department of the from 1912 to 1916
- Hope Pyburn Johnson, for two terms District chairman, Public Health, California Fed. Women's Clubs
- Antoinette Kinney, founder and first president of the Utah Federation of Women's Clubs
- Edith O. Kitt, Tucson Woman's Club (president), Southern Arizona District Federation Women's Clubs (president), Arizona State Federation Women's Clubs (president)
- Nannie S. Brown Kramer, organizer, vice-president and chairman of the Oakland Women's City Club; this club had three thousand members and erected a new building which cost $600,000.00
- Bertha Ethel Knight Landes (1868–1943)
- Julia Lathrop (1858–1932)
- Jeanette Lawrence, State Chairman of Literature of the California Federation of Women's Clubs
- Nancy A. Leatherwood, president of Utah Federation of Women's Clubs and Director for Utah of the General Federation of Women's Clubs
- Mab Copland Lineman, State Chairman of Law for the Business and Insurance California Federation of Women's Clubs
- Georgina G. Marriott, Utah Federation
- Edith Bolte MacCracken, president of the District Federation of Women's Clubs
- Laura Adrienne MacDonald, president of Tonopah Woman's Club
- Jane Brunson Marks, served as Philanthropic Chairman of Woman's Club of Burbank and was the President of Woman's Club of Burbank from 1927 to 1928 and reelected from 1928 to 1929
- Olive Dickerson McHugh, President of the Federated Woman's Club of Mullen
- Ruth Karr McKee, Washington State Federarion of Women's Clubs and Director of the General Federation
- Maybelle Stephens Mitchell (1872–1919), served in the Atlanta Woman's Club
- Mabel Montgomery (1879–1968) vice-president of the South Carolina Federation of Women's Clubs
- Eva Perry Moore (1852–1931)
- Evelyn Williams Moulton, president of the Wilshire Woman's Club and the Dean Club of Southern California
- Jacqueline Noel, served as chairperson to the Division of Literature at the Washington State Federation of Women's Clubs
- Virginia Keating Orton, vice-president of Washington State Federation of Women's Clubs
- Fanny Purdy Palmer (1839–1923), one of the originators of the General Federation of Women's Clubs
- Fannie Brown Patrick, president of the State Federation of Women's Clubs of Nevada
- Mary Gray Peck, chair, Drama Sub-Committee of the Committee on Literature and Library Extension in the General Federation.
- Lulu Hunt Peters, Chair of the public health committee of the Los Angeles California Federation of Women's clubs and pioneer in counting calories for weight loss.
- Phebe Nebeker Peterson, vice-president of the State Federation of Women's Clubs
- Grace Gimmini Potts, chairman of Literature and Drama for the California Federation of Women's Clubs
- Bessie Leach Priddy, educator, social reformer leader of the Delta Delta Delta women's fraternity and chairman of the General Federation of Women's Clubs
- Lois Randolph, State Chairman of Americanization under the New Mexico Federation of Women's Clubs
- Edith Dolan Riley, chair of the Motion Picture Committee of the Washington State Federation of Women's Clubs
- Lallah Rookh White Rockwell, member of the State Federation of Women's Clubs
- Eleanor Roosevelt (1884–1962)
- Margaret Wheeler Ross, president Arizona Fed. Women's Clubs
- Nellie Tayloe Ross (1876–1977)
- Fannie Forbis Russel, one of the pioneer women of the state of Montana, was active in organizing and building the local Woman's Club
- Julia Green Scott (1839–1923), president of the Daughters of the American Revolution
- Mary Belle King Sherman (1862–1935)
- Margaret Chase Smith (1897–1995)
- Mary Jane Spurlin, president of the Portland Federation of Women's Clubs
- Delphine Anderson Squires (1868-1961), Nevada state representative
- Helen Norton Stevens,
  - editor of the official bulletin of the Washington State Federation of Women's Clubs and
  - chairman of Civic Department of the Seattle Woman's Club
- Emily Jean Crimson Thatcher, president of the U. A. C. Woman's Club
- Frances F. Threadgill, first president of the Oklahoma State Federation of Women's Clubs (1909), Treasurer GFWC (1910–1912)
- Catherine E. Van Valkenburg, State Chairman of Music of the Idaho Federation of Women's Clubs
- Edith Brake West,
  - From 1911 to 1914, president of the Nevada Federation of Women's Clubs,
  - from 1918 to 1920 she was director from Nevada of the General Federation of Women's Clubs.
  - She was vice-chairman of the Junior Memberships of the General Federation of Women's Clubs.
  - She was the life secretary of the Presidents of 1912 of the General Federation of Women's Clubs.
  - She compiled a collection of Nevada Poems for the Nevada Federation of Women's Clubs
- Laura Lyon White (1839–1916), co-founded, California Club of California, on December 27, 1897, in San Francisco. It joined the General Federation of Women's Clubs, in May 1898.
- Helen Augusta Whittier, co-founder, editor, publisher, The Federation Bulletin (monthly), the official national organ of the GFWC
- Gertrude B. Wilder, president of the San Bernardino County Federation of Women's Clubs
- Frances Willard (1839–1898)
- Jane Frances Winn, one of the founders of the Century Club in Chillicothe, Ohio
- Alice Ames Winter, national president of the GFWC
- Belle Wood-Comstock, chairman of Public Health at the Los Angeles District of California Federation of Women's Clubs
- Orpha Woods Foster, president of the Ventura County Federation of Women's Clubs
- Ellen S. Woodward (1887–1971)
- Valeria Brinton Young, member of the Executive Board of the State Federation of Women's Clubs
- Zitkála-Šá (1876–1938), also known as Gertrude Simmons Bonnin. A Yankton Dakota writer, editor, translator, musician, educator, and political activist, she joined the GFWC in 1921, was active in its women's rights efforts, and created the Indian Welfare Committee in 1924. She co-founded the National Council of American Indians in 1926.

== See also ==
- Alabama Federation of Women’s Clubs
- Anchorage Woman's Club
- Casa Grande Woman's Club
- Federation of Women's Clubs for Oklahoma and Indian Territories
- General Federation of Women's Clubs of South Carolina
- Glendale Woman's Club
- Mississippi Federation of Women's Clubs
- National Association of Colored Women's Clubs
- Nineteenth Amendment to the United States Constitution
- Ossoli Circle
- Women's club movement
- Woman's Club of Olympia
- Women's Institute
- Women-only space
