= Atlanta Woman's Club =

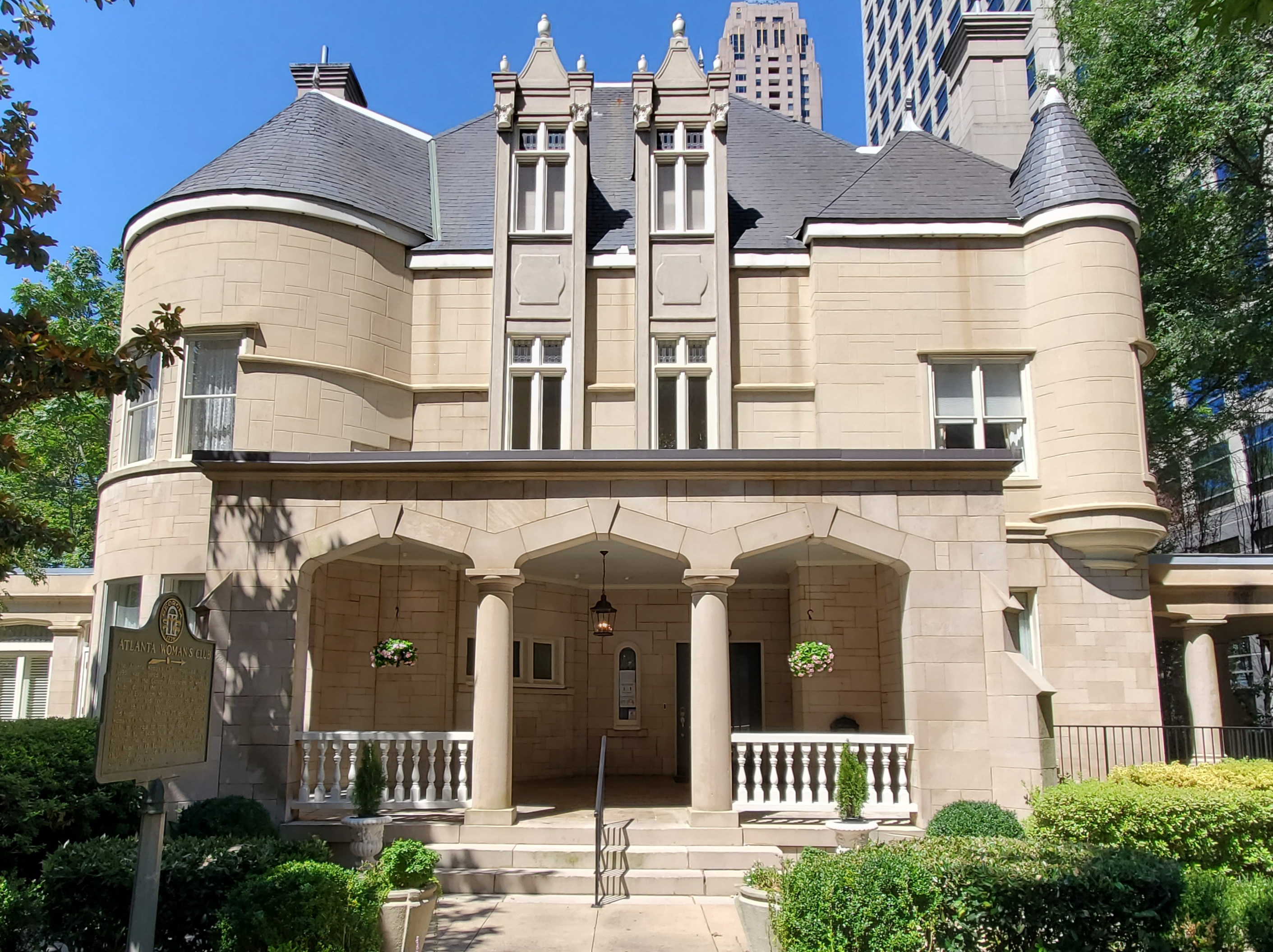
The Wimbish House, the club's headquarters, in 2020

The Atlanta Woman's Club is a nonprofit organization founded in 1895 in Atlanta. It is a philanthropic 501(c)(3) organization made up of professional women of all ages, races and religions.

The Atlanta Woman's Club is part of the Georgia Federation of Women’s Clubs, as well as the General Federation of Women's Clubs. The Georgia Federation of Women's Clubs (GFWC Georgia) is a state organization composed of 150 women's clubs throughout the State of Georgia, whose members provide volunteer service to their communities. Each Club sets their own agendas and works on projects and programs that address the specific needs of their communities. Members of all ages have opportunities for personal growth and enrichment through leadership training and development. Every Georgia clubwoman is also a member of the General Federation of Women's Clubs (GFWC). The General Federation of Women's Clubs is an international philanthropic organization headquartered in Washington, D.C. The General Federation of Women's Clubs is the oldest, non-denomination, non-partisan, largest international service organization of volunteer women in the world with a membership of 10 million worldwide, in 40 countries.

== Club history ==
As quoted by former President Jimmy Carter and his wife, Roslyn Carter in their foreword in "A Light on Peachtree: A History of the Atlanta Woman's Club": "Many in Atlanta may not realize that our city and the state of Georgia could have faced a very different history had it not been for the successful advocacy and funding of several important projects undertaken by the Atlanta Woman's Club, most notably with the inception and development of the Atlanta airport."

The Atlanta Woman's Club was formed in 1895 following a meeting of the Cotton States Exposition in Piedmont Park. The council of the General Federation of Women's Clubs (GFWC) was in held Atlanta and Rebecca Douglas Lowe was present at this meeting. Following the meeting at Piedmont Park in the fall of 1895, Mrs. Lowe gathered together a group of interested ladies in her home. After this gathering, the Atlanta Woman’s Club was formed and Mrs. Lowe was elected its leader. In 1896, Mrs. Lowe invited 17 other women's clubs to meet and form the Georgia Federation of Women's Clubs. She became the President of the GFWC Georgia in 1897. She ultimately went on to serve as the president of the General Federation of Women's Clubs (GFWC) from 1898–1902.

The Atlanta Woman's Club's first home was in Mrs. Lowe’s home. The Club then moved to the DeGive Opera House in downtown Atlanta, which was also known as the Loew's Grand Theatre. In 1910, the Atlanta Woman's Club purchased its first home, which was the Christian Science building located on West Baker Street at the intersection of Peachtree Street and West Peachtree. The Atlanta Woman’s Club remained in that home until 1920 at which time they moved to the Wimbish House in Atlanta, Georgia.

=== 1900s ===
The early 1900s was known as the Gilded Age and widespread economic growth pushed the U.S. ahead of Britain, especially through heavy industry like factories, railroads, and coal mining. These businesses were powered by a cheap underclass of laborers, many of whom were small children. When the first Club President Rebecca Lowe encouraged the Club to look into areas of needed reform, GFWC clubwomen of this era responded by working for a public kindergarten, better working conditions, the enactment of child labor laws, and the creation of night schools for child factory workers. The General Federation of Woman’s Club expressed at the time “So long as children six years of age are employed in mills and factories can any woman’s club say it has no responsibility?” At the same time clubwomen continued to broaden their own educational opportunities and those of community by hosting a variety of educational lectures and programs on topics from sociology, to taxation to the arts. The Atlanta Woman's Club became part of the greater efforts of the Georgia Federation of Women's Clubs to support education in Georgia’s mountainous regions and supported the establishment of the Tallulah Falls School in 1909. According to one early Club member, “The decline in gossip is really startling. Not so much that we are better than we used to be, but just haven’t the time.”

In the second decade of the 1900s the Club became increasingly concerned about drug abuse and juvenile justice. The club campaigned against drugs, worked with prisoners in the city stockade and women's jail, and campaigned against the exploitation of minors. The GFWC clubwomen were so effective that the New York Times commended them for their ability to work quietly behind the scenes in getting their men folk to bring about social reform such as ending the evil system of leasing convicts. The Club created a good roads committee, worked towards the establishment of a Municipal employment Bureau, and formed a committee to censor motion pictures for children. They promoted peace efforts in Europe, but once World War I broke out, they worked tirelessly to improve conditions for American soldiers abroad by preparing medical kits and encouraging the sale of war bonds. However, in the early 1900s women were still barred from all state supported institutions of higher learning, had yet to receive the vote, and were obviously not making decisions about war and peace. After two decades of work on behalf of child laborers there was finally legislation requiring children between the ages 8 and 14 to attend school at least 3 months a year. Although the Club focused heavily on equal education for women, it generally avoided overt support of the suffragettes of this era. Georgia’s agricultural economy was changing at this time from a cotton based economy to fruits and vegetables. The clubwomen supported this by creating the idea of local curb markets to sell Georgia produce and the Sweet Auburn Curb Market, known today as the Municipal Market was formed and still thrives today.

=== 1920s ===
In the 1920s the Atlanta Woman’s Club’s membership rose to over 1,000 members. During this time the GFWC clubwomen opposed an effort to exclude Catholic teachers from public schools, they put together the Atlanta Woman's Club Cookbook 1921 that was distributed all over the world, they started a university for homemakers teaching home economics and providing a playroom downtown to take care of children, and in a meeting initiated by the Atlanta Woman’s Club president in 1925 with the Mayor of Atlanta, the club president urged the City to purchase a landing field south of Atlanta. That landing field is now the busiest airport in the world and has led the city to become the vibrant business center that it is.

=== 1930s ===
In the 1930s the speculation of the 1920s caught up with reality resulting in the Great Depression. Of course this created additional opportunities for philanthropy and social service, but the cost of club work and the members’ financial conditions were also of concern. The Atlanta Woman's Club members were thrifty and managed to continue to work on a wide variety of projects. They worked to widen the outlet for Georgia Farm goods by staging an exposition of Georgia grown products at the Atlanta city auditorium and sponsored plant sales at the farmers market to help women from rural areas with an additional source of income. AWC club women also continued to sponsor programs to educate themselves and the community about family finance as women became more responsible for supplementing for providing family income. The Atlanta Woman’s Club celebrated the success of their efforts to get women admitted to University of Georgia and included as doctors at the State Hospital for the mentally ill. In 1935 when President Roosevelt visited Georgia, the Atlanta Woman's Club president served on the welcoming committee. The Club was also behind a committee to plant an eventual 1,000 dogwood trees in the city of Atlanta. The Club became the venue for the Atlanta Writers Club, and presented a variety of charity performances in the auditorium to benefit the needy.

=== 1940s ===
The decade of the 1940s marked the 50th anniversary of women's clubs. Women across the country celebrated. As another war in broke out in Europe, clubwomen emphasized peace and helped members to learn more about international affairs. The Atlanta Woman’s Club participated in GFWC’s campaigns to finance America's military needs. A “buy a bomber” campaign across the women’s clubs of the country brought in an astounding $101 million. $154 million was raised to finance an air Armada for the Navy. The Atlanta Woman's Club members donated 568,000 hours of service to the defense effort. When the war ended, the Club participated in efforts to support veterans, as well as other initiatives to continue to support preschool training for children, support for Georgia products, conservation, and preservation of the States Forests, and the arts.

=== 1950s ===
With the Kennedys in the White House and war temporarily over, the Arts seemed to capture the interest of The Atlanta Woman’s club members in the 1950s. The Club members presented both a play and vocal performance highlighting the history of the Club. They offered programs related to music, opera, writing, antiques, and art. But still had serious concerns. Club members became interested in helping the mentally, physically and developmentally disabled. They promoted the early use of seat belts, and continued their focus on juveniles by advocating their release out of Georgia prisons. They supported the passage of the Fugitive Fathers bill, and pushed for the development of programs for rehabilitating prisoners. As always they continued to focus on to Talullah Falls School and supported a plan to modernize the school by adding a President's House, an athletic field, and modern classroom buildings.

=== 1960s ===
The 60's was an era of uneasiness with concerns about assassination, civil unrest and the war in Vietnam. GFWC clubwomen’s work reflected this with support and concern for veterans, help for the needy, and emphasis on international relations. The plight of the Native Americans and preservation of Native American culture was also a national issue at that time and the GFWC held a meeting with a prominent Indian Affairs Officer to learn more.

Although the Atlanta Woman’s Club members were progressive in many ways, and in spite of GFWC’s diversity motto, in the era of Jim Crow, the Club was segregated. A similar club for African American women Atlanta Federation of Negro Women’s Clubs existed at this time. Today, the Club enjoys a very diverse membership.

=== 1970s ===
The 1970s were challenging for the women's clubs. More vocal champions of women's liberation were effecting change throughout the country through protests and marches, whereas GFWC club members were used to working through legislative and other more traditional avenues. But the times were changing and the Georgia Federation of Women's Club president showed up at her installation banquet wearing of all things... a pantsuit! Many women continued to believe that the Atlanta Woman’s Club’s headquarters, Wimbish House, located in downtown Atlanta was dangerous and the membership grew smaller and older. Nonetheless, the Club continued to pursue its mission, including supporting Bicentennial events, raising money for a chapel at Tallulah Falls School, and working to save the historic Fox Theater from destruction.

=== 1980s ===
In the 1980s among the GFWC club projects in this era were getting safety crossing arms installed on school buses, getting the legislature to pass the first child restraint law, getting stricter DUI laws, and stopping a bill that would allow motorcyclists to forgo helmets.

=== 1990s ===
The 1990s were a despairing decade for the Atlanta Woman's Club. The club headquarters, The Wimbish House was broken into and irreplaceable antiques were stolen. Shortly after, a fire destroyed part of the house. Although the Atlanta Woman's Club members were emotionally drained by these events, but with Scarlett O'Hara determination, the sturdy members decided that if they could save the Fox Theatre they'd better save the Grand Old Lady of Peachtree. The House was rebuilt under the watchful eyes of architect Zachary Henderson who specialized in restoration of older homes.

== GFWC notable clubwomen ==
- Rebecca Douglas Lowe
- Mary Ann Lipscomb
- Mildred Seydell (1889–1988)
- Helen Magill, wife of Asa G. Candler
- Jane Addams (1860–1935)
- Nellie Peters Black (1851-1919)
- Clementine Cordelia Berry Buchwalter (1843-1912)
- Sarah Johnson Cocke (1865-1944), charter member
- Jane Cunningham Croly (1829–1901)
- Susan Topliff Davis (1862-1931)
- Ellen Curtis Demorest (1824–1898)
- Lizzie Crozier French (1851–1926)
- Corinne Stocker Horton (1871-1947)
- Julia Ward Howe (1819–1910)
- May Mann Jennings (1872–1963)
- Bertha Ethel Knight Landes (1868–1943)
- Julia Lathrop (1858–1932)
- Maybelle Stephens Mitchell (1872–1919)
- Margaret Mitchell (1900-1949)
- Eva Perry Moore (1853–1931)
- Eleanor Roosevelt (1884–1962)
- Nellie Tayloe Ross (1876–1977)
- Mary Belle King Sherman (1862–1935)
- Margaret Chase Smith (1897–1995)
- Frances Willard (1839–1898)
- Ellen S. Woodward (1887–1971)
