= Annie Green =

Annie Green(e) may refer to:

- Annie Greene Brown (1855–1923), née Greene, author of the American South
- Annie Greene Nelson (1902–1993), née Greene, African American writer and playwright
- Annie Maria V. Green, pioneer of the Union Colony of Colorado
- Annie Sawyer Green, president of the California Federation of Women's Clubs

== See also ==
- Anne Green (disambiguation)
