= Lotta Hetler James =

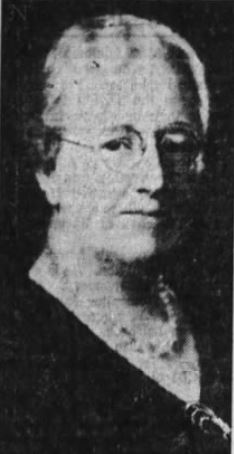
Lotta Hetler James

Lotta Hetler James (1876 - March 18, 1945) was an American public speaker, active in civic, church and community projects.She was also a candidate for Governor of California.

== Early life ==
Lotta Hetler was born in 1876 in Chicago, Illinois.

== Career ==
Lotta Hetler James was a teacher at Elgin Academy for eight years.

She was president of the Art Study Club in Elgin, Illinois, for four years, and of the Hanford Woman's Club, in Hanford, California. She was the first president of the Kings County Federation of Clubs, president of the San Joaquin district federation and then from 1936 to 1938 president of the California Federation of Women's Clubs.

James was also chairman of the Child Welfare Resolution Committee of the State Federation Women's Clubs, charter member and chairman of the Education and Membership committees of Elgin, Illinois of the Young Men's Christian Association, member of the Hanford Woman's Club Coterie, the Hanford Presbyterian Church and the Hanford Business and Professional Women's Club.

In 1937 she ran for Governor of California; the California Federation of Women's Clubs, of which she was the outgoing president, during the annual convention in Quincy, California, launched her candidacy. Dr. Louise May Richter, one of her sponsors, said: "We need a woman as State executive and Mrs. James has such good common sense, I am sure she would be an excellent governor. California never has had a woman governor. After watching the performances of some of the man, I think it is time to put a woman in office."

== Personal life ==
Lotta Hetler James lived in Elgin, Illinois, and then moved to California in 1913 and lived at 421 W. Elm Street, Hanford, California.

Lotta Hetler married Wilber Delno James (1875-1929). They had two sons: Austin H. James and Lieutenant Richard D. James. After she was a widow, she made home with her lifelong friend Olive I. Lester, a fellow officer at the Business and Professional Women's Club, at 415 North Douty Street.

She died on March 18, 1945, and is buried with her husband at Hanford Cemetery, Hanford, California. As perpetual memorial to her name the Hanford Women's Club provided a subscription to the Reader's Digest braille edition to be kept in the California Home for Blind.
