= Fannie Jean Black =

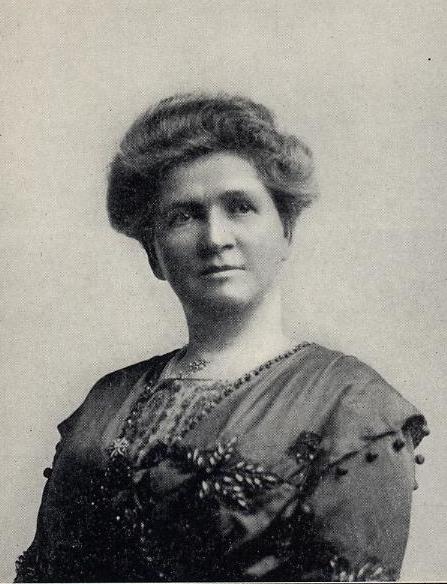
Fannie Jean Black

Fannie Jean Black was an American clubwoman who was the president of the San Francisco California Club from 1910 to 1912 and the chair for San Francisco County on Woman's Auxiliary Board for the Panama–Pacific International Exposition in 1915.

== Early life ==
Fannie Jean Lyne was born in San Francisco, California, daughter of William Lyne and Catherine Young, early settlers of California.

She graduated from Broadway Grammar School in 1876, from Girls' High School in 1879, and from San Francisco State Normal School in 1880.

== Career ==
She was very active in civic and women's club affairs; she was the president of Women's City Club into which The National League for Women's Service was resolved.

In 1905, she was named president of the Alumnae Association Girls' High School.

In 1909, she was chair of the Press Department of the California Federation of Women's clubs, and from 1910 to 1912, she was president of the San Francisco District of the California Federation of Women's clubs.

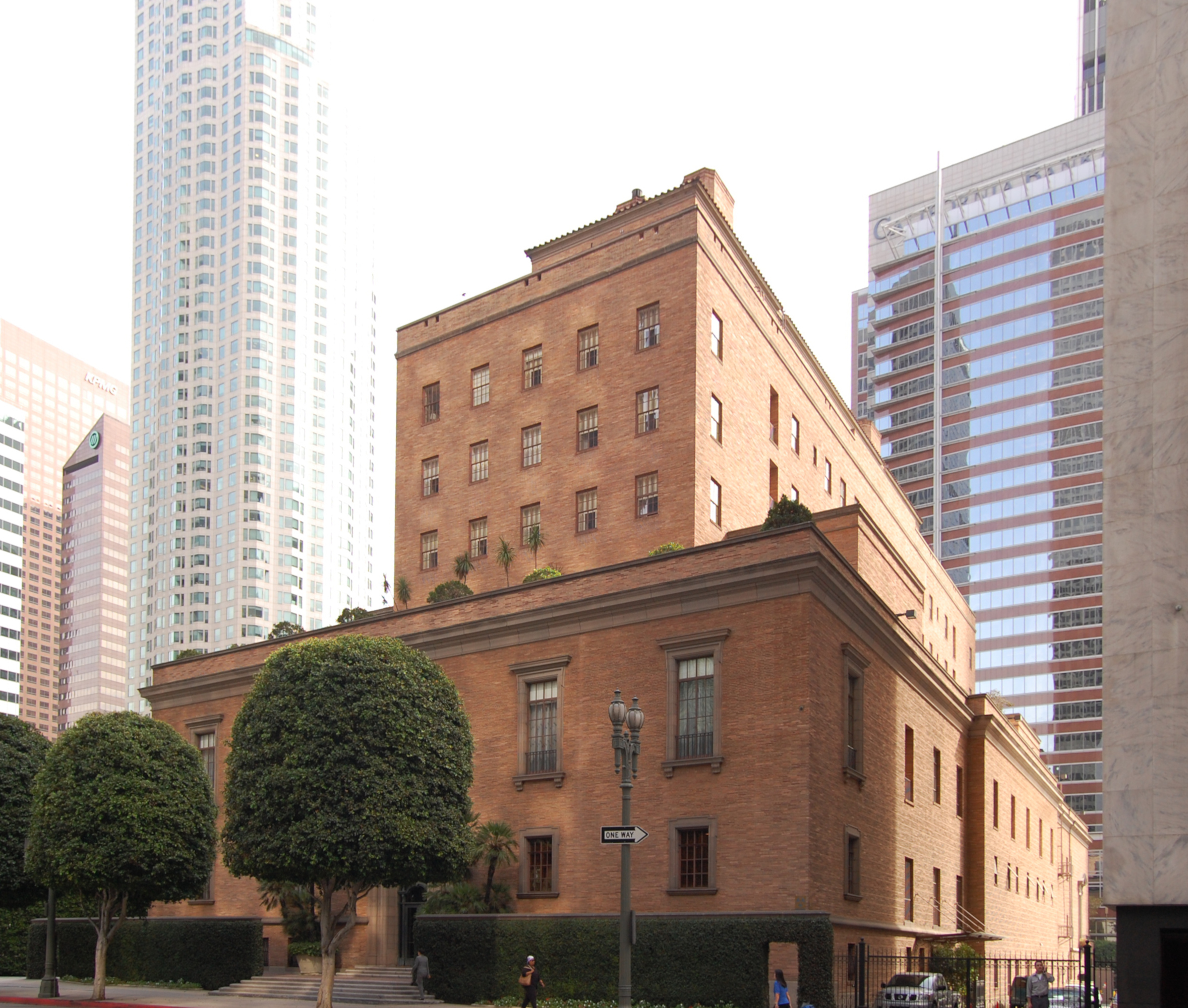
California Club

She was president of the Women's City Club and from 1912 to 1914 she was president of the California Club.

She held several positions in different clubs. She was the chairman for San Francisco County on Woman's Auxiliary Board for the Panama–Pacific International Exposition in 1915.

Since 1918, she was first secretary and then director of the Traveler's Aid Board.

She was a member of the Western Woman's Club, San Francisco Center, English-Speaking Union, Commission for Relief in Belgium.

== Personal life ==
On August 25, 1887, Fannie Jean Lyne married Alfred Pressly Black (b. 1856), a San Francisco attorney, and they had three children: Harold Alfred, Emma Francis Kew, Marion Alice Wagner. Another son, William Lyne Black, died young. She lived at 1260 Chestnut Street, San Francisco, California.
