= Virginia Keating Orton =

Virginia Carter Keating MacCraig Orton (November 1, 1882 - December 25, 1960), A.B., was the vice-president of Washington State Federation of Women's Clubs.

== Early life ==
Virginia Carter Keating MacCraig Orton was born on November 1, 1882, in Virginia, the daughter of Edward J. Keating and Jewel Carter Davis. Hers was an aristocratic family.

== Career ==
She was a writer of verse and short stories.

She was a leader in social, cultural, art and literary activities; she was active in welfare and charity work.

She was the vice-president of Washington State Federation of Women's Clubs.

She was president of the Sumner Garden Club and vice-president of the Tacoma Drama League.

She was a member of Board of American Red Cross, Girl Scout Council, Board of Charities of the Anti-Tuberculosis Association, Western Washington Art Association, Sumner Civic Club, Tacoma Garden Club, Tacoma Tennis Club, Tacoma Country and Golf Club, Tacoma Fine Arts Club, Tacoma Bohemian Club, Seattle Free Lance Writers' Club, Linden Golf Club.

== Personal life and family ==
Virginia Keating Orton moved to Washington in 1920 and lived at Orton Place, Elhi Road, Sumner, Washington. In 1922 she married Charles Waite Orton (1877-1963), a college-educated man who built a showplace home on his farm near Sumner and in 1914 started raising bulbs. He became the president of the Board of Regents of the Washington State University. Orton Hall at Washington State University honors Charles Waite Orton. His brother, Edward "Ed" Orton raised daffodil bulbs and other products. He sold land to Japanese laborers, and when the Japanese were interned in World War II, he kept farming their land and maintaining their homes so that their properties were available to them when they were freed.

She died on December 25, 1960, and is buried at Sumner Cemetery, Sumner, Washington.
