= Catherine E. Van Valkenburg =

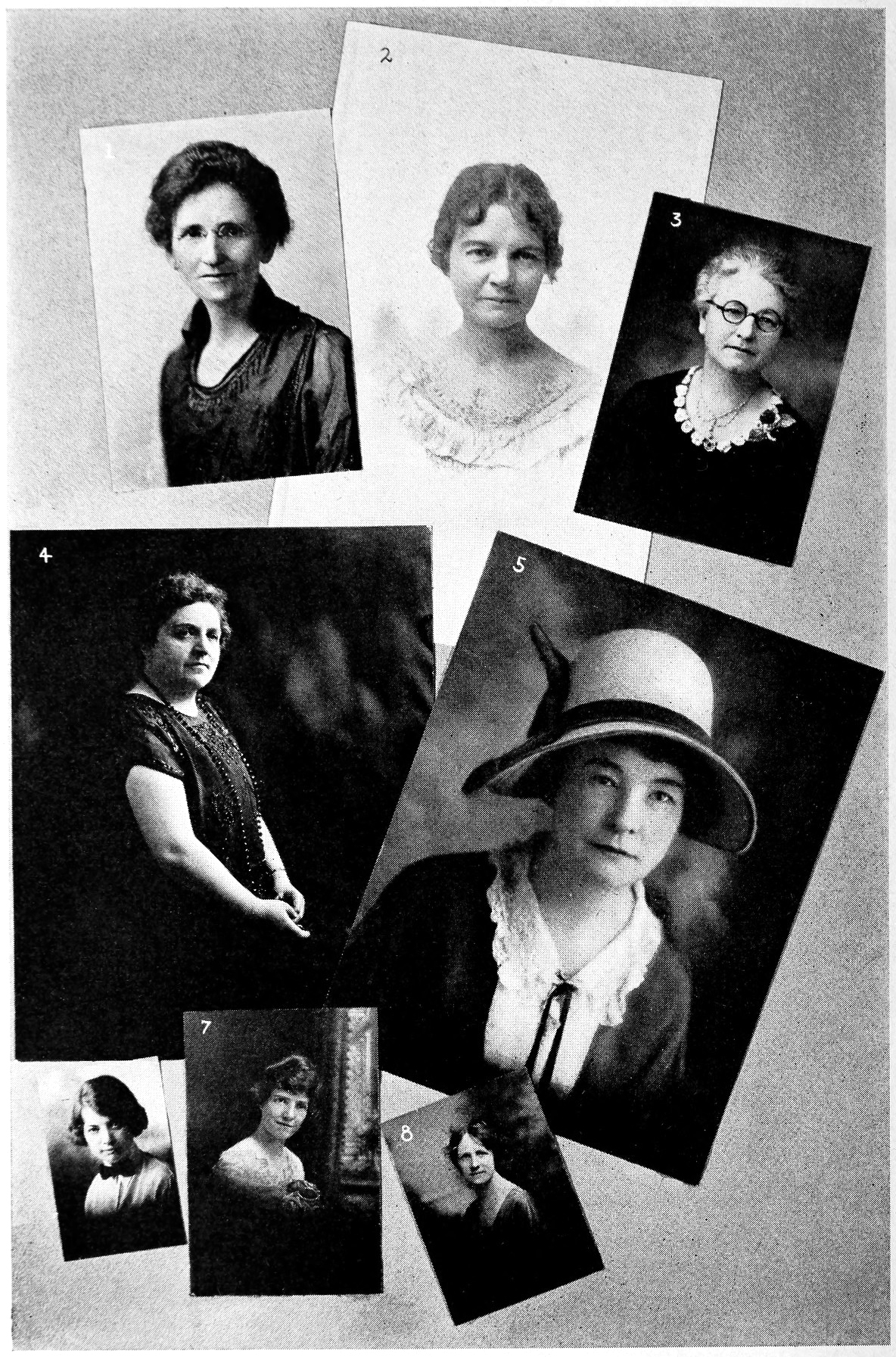
A Few of the Eminent Women of Idaho and Montana, Maggie Smith Hathaway, Alma Margaret Higgins, Irene Welch Grissom, Ethel Redfield, Alma E. Plumb, Letitia H. Erb, Mrs. Bernard McHugh, Catherine E. Van Valkeburg

Catherine E. Fogarty Van Valkeburg (September 2, 1880 - February 12, 1961) was an American concert pianist.

== Biography ==
Catherine E. Fogarty was born on September 2, 1880, in De Graff, Minnesota, the daughter of Jeremiah and Mary Fogarty.

She moved to Idaho in 1917 and lived at Priest River, Idaho, and then Boise, Idaho. In 1953, she moved to Tucson, Arizona.

She was a musician who piano and public school music for 20 years. She was an organist. She was several times delegate to State and District Conventions of Women's Clubs. She was always interested in the advancement of "Good Music for Idaho".

She married Adelbert Curtiss Van Valkenburg. Their children were: Aileen Clare Kapera, Marguerite Whetsler, Catharine Allen.

She was the president of the Cultus Club, and State Chairman of Music of the Idaho Federation of Women's Clubs.

She died on February 12, 1961, in Tucson, Arizona, and is buried at Holy Hope Cemetery, Tucson.
