= Belle Wood-Comstock =

American physician

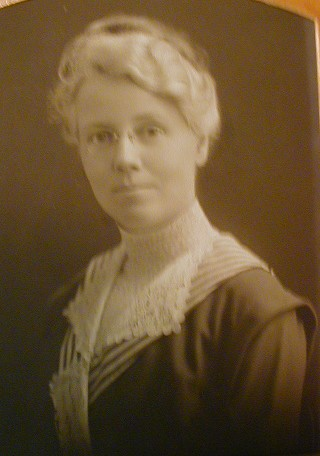
- Born: November 20, 1880; Fargo, Wisconsin
- Died: May 22, 1961 (aged 80)
- Occupations: Physician, writer

Belle Jessie Wood-Comstock (November 20, 1880 – May 22, 1961) was an American physician and author of medical advice books.

== Early life ==
Belle Jessie Wood-Comstock was born on November 20, 1880, in Fargo, Wisconsin, the daughter of William Wood and Mattie Whipple.

After teaching in public schools for seven years, she studied medicine in Battle Creek, Michigan. In 1909 she graduated in medicine at the University of Southern California. She specialized in endocrinology.

== Career ==
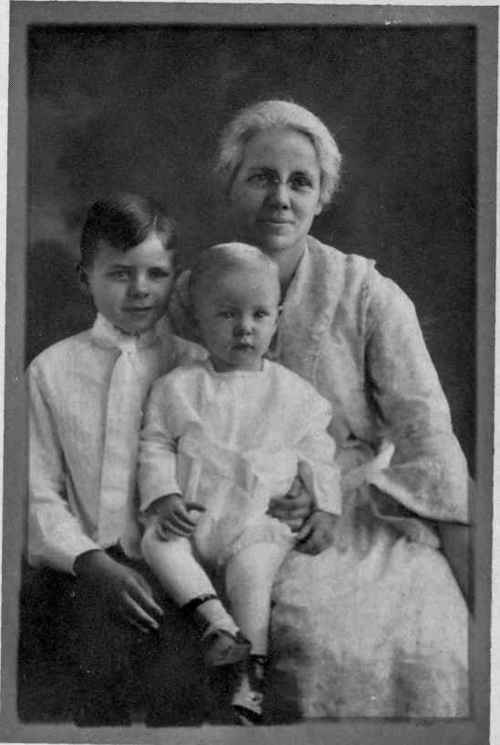
Belle Wood-Comstock

For seven years Belle Wood-Comstock was the head woman physician at the Glendale Sanitarium and Hospital. She organized the visiting nurse organization and conducted health institutes. She had a private practice in Pasadena and Los Angeles for twelve years. Her specialty was Diseases of Nutrition.

For many years she was a writer and lecturer on health topics. She was also a columnist on health for the Los Angeles Times.

She was the chairman of Public Health at the Los Angeles District of California Federation of Women's Clubs. She was on the staff of the White Memorial Hospital and in charge of the White Memorial Dispensary Nutrition Clinic. She was on the advisory board of Health Department of the Los Angeles City Schools.

She was a member of the Medical Women's Society of Los Angeles County, the American Medical Association, the Los Angeles County Medical Society, the Los Angeles Obstetrical Society and the Professional Woman's Club of Los Angeles.

She was professor emeritus at the College of Medical Evangelists.

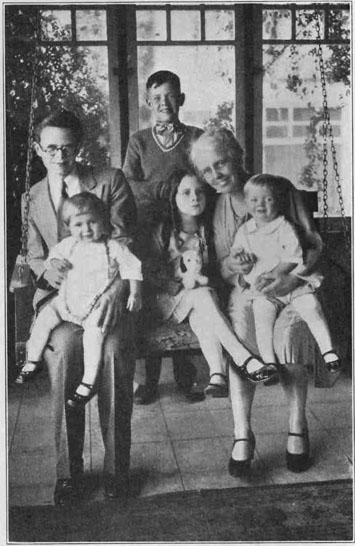
Author with her family, frontispiece in Belle Wood Comstock's book The Home Dietitian

== Publications ==
She is the author of:

- The home dietitian; or, Food and health; scientific dietetics practically applied (1922)
- Physiology; the human body and how to keep it in health (1925)
- The Human Body and how to keep it in Health (1925)
- A journey to Happy Healthland: Health Hints for Boys and Girls (1930)
- Through Early Childhood: The Care and Education of the Child from Three to Nine (1930)
- All about the baby; the beginnings of human life with early needs (1930)
- Three times a day (1937)
- Plain facts for girls and young women on narcotics, liquor, and tobacco (1938)
- Is love enough? A discussion of the problems of the home and of married life (1940)
- Growing Boys and Girls (1947)
- Questions girls have asked (1962)

== Personal life ==
Belle Wood-Comstock moved to California in 1908 and lived at 4671 Pasadena Are. (later N. Figueroa Ave.), Los Angeles, California. On June 27, 1907, in St. Joseph, Michigan, she married Dr. Daniel Delos Comstock (d. 1948), professor of Medical Science at the College of Medical Evangelists. They had five children: Delos Comstock (later a doctor), Pierson Comstock, Patricia "Patty" Jane Comstock Nelson, Kenneth W Comstock and Martha Ellen Comstock Comley.

She died on May 22, 1961 at the age of 80, and is buried at Forest Lawn Memorial Park in Glendale, California.
