= Evelyn Williams Moulton =

Evelyn E. Williams Moulton (July 15, 1876 - February 19, 1971) was an American club woman.

== Early life ==
Evelyn E. Williams was born on July 15, 1876, in Philadelphia, Pennsylvania, the daughter of Alfred Williams.

== Career ==
Evelyn Williams Moulton was especially interested in all public questions affecting the welfare of women and children.

She was president of the Wilshire Woman's Club and the Dean Club of Southern California.

She was a member of the Republican Study Club, Political League, Athletic Club, Casa del Mar and Gables Beach Clubs.

== Personal life ==
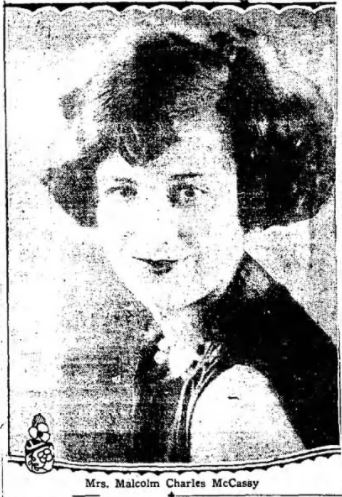
Clarissa Derry Moulton

Evelyn Williams Moulton moved to Los Angeles in 1921 and lived at 958 Keniston Ave., Los Angeles, California.

She married Capt. Percy Daniel Moulton (1881-1942), Lieutenant Colonel of the Medical Corps of the United States Army, and had three children: Clarissa Derry Moulton (1904-1973, married first Malcolm Charles McCassy and second Charles B. Overacker), Julia Evelyn Moulton Willson (1911-1979), and Daniel Percy Moulton (1906-1952), a surgeon.

In 1928, the family moved to Portsmouth, New Hampshire, where Percy Daniel Moulton became the city editor for the Portsmouth Herald. After Percy Daniel Moulton's retirement, the family moved back to Los Angeles where Evelyn Williams Moulton went back to preside the Wilshire Woman's Club.

She died on February 19, 1971, and is buried at Arlington National Cemetery, Arlington, together with her husband.
