= Edith Brake West =

American educator and suffragist

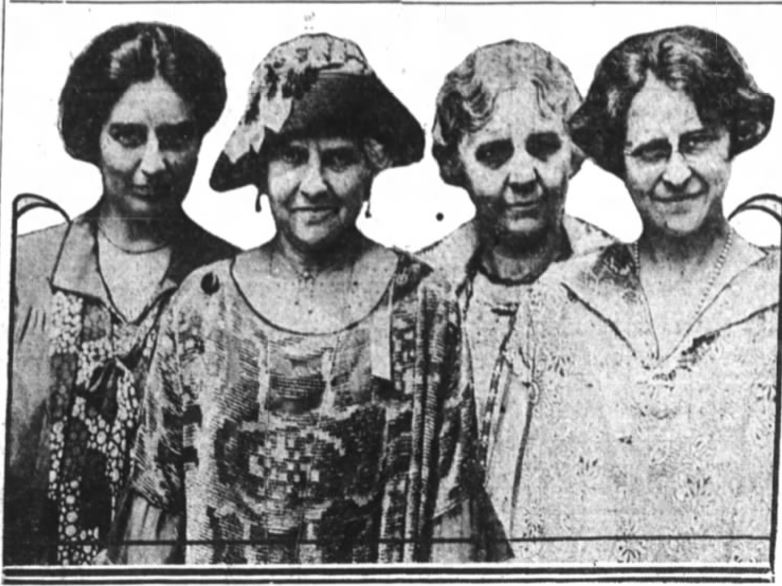
- From l to r: Helen Van Gulpen Harris, chairman of legislation of the County Federation of Women's Club, Mrs. L.G. Leonard, former president, Mrs. Frederick G. Athearn, new president, Edith Brake West, chairman of American Citizenship
- Born: June 18, 1885; Fowler, Indiana
- Spouse: George Franklin West

Edith Brake West (born June 18, 1885) was an American educator. She conducted a ground-breaking survey of county organizations which was recognized by the National Federation of Women's Clubs.

== Early life ==
Edith Brake was born on June 18, 1885, in Fowler, Indiana, the daughter of Edwin V. and Mary Brake.

She graduated from the Colorado Teacher's College and did post-graduate work at University of Denver and University of California.

== Career ==
Edith Brake West was active in civic and club work.

She was assistant superintendent of schools for Denver County, Colorado.

She taught in Colorado, Nevada and California.

From 1911 to 1914, she was the president of the Nevada Federation of Women's Clubs, and from 1918 to 1920 she was director from Nevada of the General Federation of Women's Clubs. She was vice-chairman of the Junior Memberships of the General Federation of Women's Clubs. She was the life secretary of the Presidents of 1912 of the General Federation of Women's Clubs. She compiled a collection of Nevada Poems for the Nevada Federation of Women's Clubs.

She was a member of the Fruitvale Women's Club, Rockridge Women's Club, Women's City Club of Oakland and East Bay.

In May 1925 she conducted a survey of county organizations which was recognized by the National Federation of Women's Clubs. For the first time in the history of federated clubs the actual accomplishment and the organization of these bodies were set forth.

In December 1944, she publicly supported the restoration of rights for the Japanese-American citizenship and advocated the restitution of their properties.

== Personal life ==
A former resident of Nevada, Edith Brake West moved to California in 1921 and lived at 2023 19th Ave., Oakland, California.

She married George Franklin West and had three children: Franklin, Robert, Marianna.
