= Phebe Nebeker Peterson =

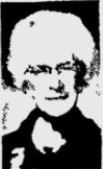
Phebe Nebeker Peterson

Phebe Almira Nebeker Peterson (June 3, 1890 - October 24, 1972) was vice-president of the State Federation of Women's Clubs.

== Early life ==
Phebe Almira Nebeker was born on June 3, 1890, in Laketown, Utah, the daughter of Hyrum Nebeker (1866-1955) and Phebe Almira Hulme (1865-1948).

She attended Brigham Young College and then studied at New England Conservatory of Music in Boston. She graduated from Utah State University.

== Career ==
She was interested in all civic and club affairs.

She was president of Faculty Women's League.

She was vice-president of the State Federation of Women's Clubs.

She was a member of U. A. C. Woman's Club, Salt Lake City Friendship Circle and LDS Hospital Board.

In 1970 she was co-chairman of the Utah State University Endowment campaign.

== Personal life ==
Phebe Nebeker Peterson moved to Logan, Utah, in 1903. She married Elmer George Peterson (1882-1958) and had four children: Marian Peterson Thomas (1915-2003), Elmer George Peterson (1920-1994), Martha Almira Peterson (1923-2004), Chase Nebeker Peterson (1929-2014). She lived at College Hill, Logan, Utah.

She died on October 24, 1972, and is buried at Logan City Cemetery, Logan, Utah.
