= Effie Adelaide Payne Austin =

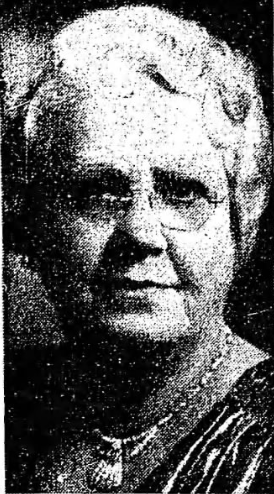
Effie Adelaide Payne Austin

Effie Adelaide Payne Austin (November 18, 1880 – October 18, 1949) a professional musician and clubwoman.

== Early life ==
Effie Adelaide Payne was born in Kansas City, Missouri, on November 18, 1880, the daughter of Frank A. Payne and Carrie Gillham. Her grandfather, Col. Milton J. Payne, was the mayor of Kansas City for seven terms and was mayor when the first railroad entered Kansas City.

She attended school in Kansas City.

== Career ==
Effie Adelaide Payne Austin was a musician by profession, a concert-organist. She was also active in civic and club affairs.

She was the president of the West Ebell Club, Los Angeles, of the Hostess President's Club and of the State Emeritus Club of California Federation.

She was State Trustee of the California Federation of Women's Clubs and president of the Los Angeles District. During her six years as trustee, she devoted much effort to the business affairs of the organization and was credited with many of the federation's sound investments.

She was a member of the General Henry Martyn Robert Parliamentary Law Club, a parliamentary club which based their meeting on the Robert's Rules of Order manual, and of the Woman's Convention Commission of the Los Angeles Chamber of Commerce. Later, she was parliamentarian of the Laguna Beach Woman's Club.

She was a member of the Euterpe Opera Reading Club, Los Angeles District Bd. Alumnae, S. P. T. C. Club.

She was active for many years on the Women's Auxiliary of the Chamber of Commerce.

== Personal life ==
Effie Adelaide Payne Austin moved to California in 1911. On August 17, 1922, she married Will Lee Austin, son of L. B. Austin of Los Angeles, California. She lived at 616 W. 124th Street, Los Angeles, California.

Her husband died in 1944 and she moved to their Laguna Beach residence. She died on October 18, 1949, at her home, 555 Bluebird Canyon Drive, Laguna Beach, California, and is buried at Melrose Abbey, Santa Ana, California.
