= General Federation of Women's Clubs of South Carolina =

Women's Club

- Formation: 1898
- Founded at: Seneca, South Carolina
- Type: Woman's club
- Website: www.gfwc-sc.org
- Formerly called: South Carolina Federation of Women's Clubs

The South Carolina Federation of Women's Clubs (SCFWC) is a woman's club founded in 1898. The name was changed to the General Federation of Women's Clubs of South Carolina (GFWC-SC) in 1990. In 1899 the SCFWC became a member of the General Federation of Women's Clubs (GFWC).

== History ==
The South Carolina Federation of Women's Clubs was formed in 1898 with thirty-two delegates from nineteen clubs. In the early years of the federation members' emphasis was on education and access to books. The SCFWC became involved with the social causes of temperance and suffrage.

The SCFWC was active in the war efforts of World War I and World War II. In 1990 the SCFWC changed its name to the General Federation of Women's Clubs of South Carolina. The club is still active.
