= Olive Dickerson McHugh =

Music instructor and activist

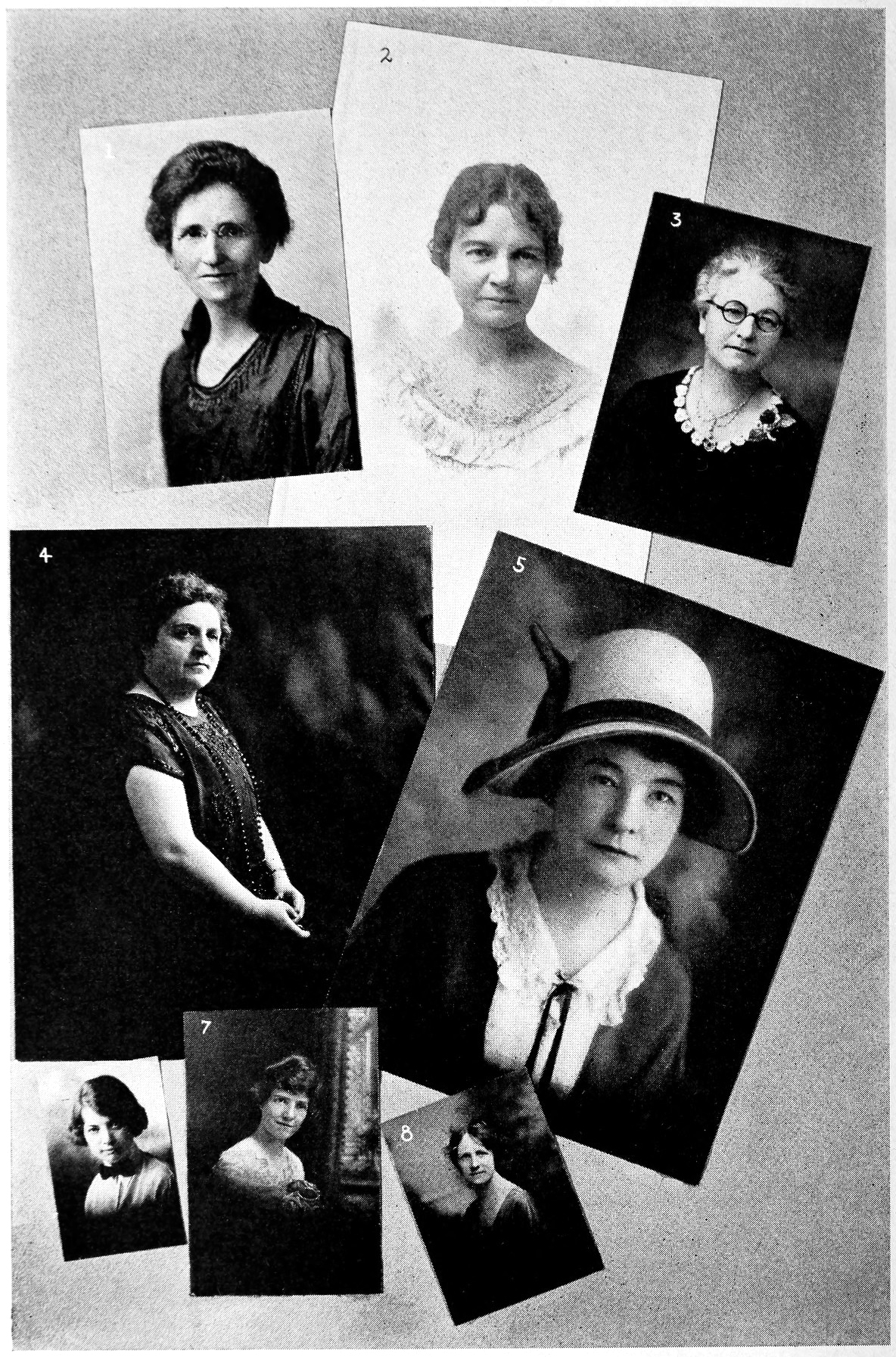
1) Maggie Smith Hathaway, 2) Alma Margaret Higgins, 3) Irene Welch Grissom, 4) Ethel Redfield, 5) Alma E. Plumb, 6) Letitia H. Erb, 7) Mrs. Bernard McHugh, 8) Catherine E. Van Valkeburg

Olive Eva Dickerson McHugh (October 3, 1885 - April 5, 1978), instructor of piano and voice, was the President of the Federated Woman's Club of Mullan.

== Early life ==
Olive Eva Dickerson was born in Guide Rock, Nebraska, on October 3, 1885, the daughter of D. F. Dickerson.

She graduated from Nebraska Wesleyan University.

== Career ==
Olive Dickerson McHugh was a music supervisor. She was instructor in High Schools of Nebraska and Idaho for 10 years; she was librarian in Iowa public schools. She was instructor in Piano and Voice.

She was a well-known soloist (soprano), dramatic coach and reader.

She was a writer of short stories and articles.

She was the President of the Federated Woman's Club of Mullan.

She was a member of Saint Cecelia Music Club, Women's Christian Temperance Union, Civic Club.

In 1939 she wrote Palace of Sin.

== Personal life ==
Olive Dickerson McHugh lived in Omaha, Nebraska, and moved to Idaho in 1925 living at 193 Mill Road, Mullan, Idaho.

In June 1927 she married Bernard M. McHugh.

She died on April 5, 1978, and is buried at Woodland Cemetery, Deer Park, Washington.
