= Antoinette Kinney =

Utah state senator from 1921 to 1925

Member of the Utah Senate from the 6th district
- In office 1921–1925

Personal details
- Born: Antoinette Brown; 1862 New York, US
- Died: 1945 (aged 82–83) Pittsburgh, Pennsylvania, US
- Resting place: Salt Lake City, Utah
- Party: Republican
- Spouse: Clesson S. Kinney
- Children: 1
- Education: University of Michigan

Antoinette Brown Kinney (1862–1945) was an American politician and community leader who served in the Utah State Senate.

She spent her childhood in New York and Tennessee before attending the University of Michigan as a young woman. She then moved to Salt Lake City, Utah, and became involved with a number of local, state, and national organizations, such as the Utah State Historical Society and General Federation of Women's Clubs, frequently occupying leadership positions. In 1893, she founded a state chapter of the Federation of Women's Clubs and served as its president. She later served as chairman and president of the League of Women Voters of Utah. In 1921, Kinney was elected to public office as a state senator representing the sixth district of Utah. She was "the only woman senator in the 1923 [Utah] legislature". During her political career, Kinney wrote multiple bills lobbying for education reform, some of which became law and some of which did not. She died in 1945 in Pennsylvania and was buried in Salt Lake City.

== Early life ==
Kinney was born in June 1862 to Joseph A. Brown, a lawyer, and Mary J. Daniels. She spent her childhood years in Rochester, New York. In 1863, when Kinney was a little over a year old, her father left the family and moved to Kansas. Her mother, in response, moved the family to Tennessee, where Kinney spent her teenage years. In 1878, her two older sisters died of yellow fever, leaving just eighteen-year-old Kinney and her mother behind. Daniels then returned north with her daughter, this time to Michigan, so that Kinney could attend the University of Michigan. She graduated in 1887. While studying at the university, Kinney met her husband, Clesson S. Kinney. They married on December 1, 1889, in Chicago and soon thereafter moved to Salt Lake City, Utah. Kinney's mother lived with the couple until her death in 1891. That same year, Kinney's only child, Selwyn Perez Kinney, was born.

== Community involvement ==
In Utah, Kinney became involved with women's organizations at local, state, and national levels. At the turn of the century, Women's clubs were a very prevalent way for Utah women—especially those not affiliated with the Latter-day Saint faith—to organize themselves. Kinney took part in various clubs, often assuming leadership positions; The Salt Lake Tribune dubbed her "one of the best-known clubwomen in the State". She served as the librarian of the Utah State Historical Society, president of Salt Lake City's Municipal Reform Club, and co-president of the Ladies Literary Club. She was also a member of the Salt Lake Women's Club, and served on the national board of directors of the General Federation of Women's Clubs.

In April 1893, at the urging of her aunt, Charlotte Emerson Brown, Kinney established the Utah Federation of Women's Clubs. She directed the Federation's first meeting, calling upon the leaders of women's clubs in Utah to attend and consider joining the new organization. The Ladies Literary Club, the Salt Lake Woman's Club, the Nineteenth Century Club, La Coterie, the Cleofan Club, and the Utah Women's Press Club all chose to become a part of the Federation, uniting LDS and non-LDS women alike. The clubs maintained their autonomy, but banded together for larger initiatives; their first collective efforts centered around "improv[ing] the social landscape of Utah". As president of the Federation, Kinney gave a presentation at the annual meeting of the Juvenile Court Association of Utah in December 1906. Kinney also organized the Provo Progressive Club, later renamed Utah Sorosis, in 1897. The goal of this organization was to "promote the highest development of its members through any avenues of study or work that [seemed] profitable". It was very common at the time for Utah women involved in politics to be members of women's organizations.

== Political career ==
Kinney acted as chairman of the League of Women Voters of Utah until becoming its first president in 1919. In this capacity, she oversaw Salt Lake City's celebration of the ratification of the Nineteenth Amendment to the United States Constitution.

From 1921 to 1925, Kinney served in the Utah State Senate as one of five senators for the sixth congressional district in Utah. She was a member of the Republican Party. At the beginning of her term, she was not the only female elected to serve in the Utah Senate; Elizabeth Hayward joined her as another senator for the sixth district. However, by 1923, she was "the only woman senator in the ... legislature". Her early efforts to pass legislation focused on improving Utah's infrastructure, and were successful; the first bills she wrote established more government-sponsored scholarships and an art institute. Another bill of Kinney's that passed implemented public health regulations regarding sanitation, specifically in schools.

Kinney lobbied for education reform multiple times during her term as senator. She tried to establish kindergarten in the state school system, but the motion was defeated. She also tried to bring the state industrial school (an institution for juvenile offenders) under the direct control of the state and lessen the power of the institutional school board, but this bill failed to pass as well. Her other endeavors included lobbying for government pensions for retirees from the University of Utah and working to establish criteria for parents seeking to adopt a child—mainly, the quality of home the children would be placed into. Kinney also created a bill that would have allowed private citizens the ability to investigate financial malpractice of Utah politicians, specifically their handling of tax funds. The Utah Senate did not, however, pass the bill into law.

== Personal life ==
Kinney received a letter in 1895 urging her to come and see her father, Joseph Brown, who was sick. She left immediately for Kansas, but Brown had died by the time she arrived. He left her an estate worth $100,000. Her husband, Clesson S. Kinney, died in 1913 while the couple was visiting Hawaii; they had hoped that the climate would improve his health. Kinney herself died in 1945 in Pittsburgh, Pennsylvania. She was 82 years old. She was buried in Salt Lake City.
