= Leah Kepner Boyce =

American journalist

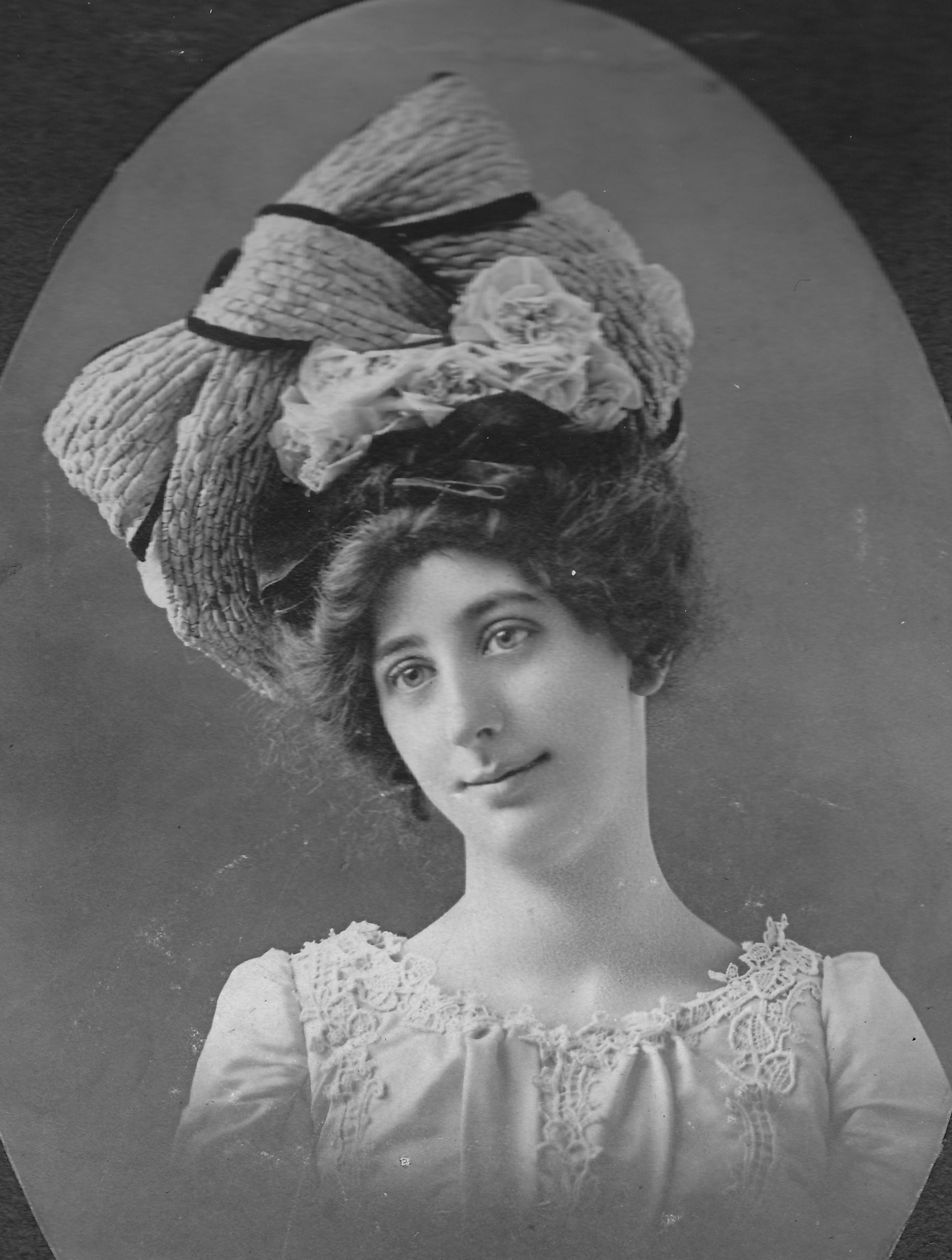
Leah Belle Kepner Boyce

Leah Kepner Boyce (May 12, 1881 – April 5, 1960) was an American journalist, civic worker, and clubwoman.

== Early life ==
Leah Belle Kepner was born in Port Carbon, Pennsylvania, the daughter of Howard Douglas Kepner (1854–1922) and Emma Rebecca Chillson Vose (1857–1917). Kepner had two siblings, Maude Evelyn Kepner Johnson (1879–1956) and John Roland Kepner (1901–1908).

== Career ==
- Press Chairman of California Federation of Women's Clubs and member of the Western Federation of Women's Clubs
- State Recording and Secretary of the California Daughters of the American Revolution (D.A.R.)
- Vice-chairman of the California Women's Law Enforcement, Committee of 5000
- Corresponding secretary of the California Parent-Teacher Association
- Member of the Mayor's Committee of San Francisco.
- Member of the Republican Women's Federation
- Member of Pen Women of America
- Member of the Woman's Christian Temperance Union

On May 9, 1935, Boyce gave an address on "Wanted" at the 49th annual convention of the Tri County Woman's Christian Temperance Union, Santa Cruz, California. In July 1937, Boyce was elected Publicity director for the White Ribbon Ensign, the California W.C.T.U.'s magazine.

In August 1937, Boyce was part of the Youths' Temperance Council conference, sponsored by the W.C.T.U. In August 1938, Boyce was director of press for the 63rd annual convention of the W.C.T.U. at the Civic Auditorium of San Francisco.

On September 28, 1939, Boyce celebrated the centenary of the birth of Frances E. Willard making a pilgrimage to "Inspiration Point" overlooking the Golden Gate Bridge. (Boyce made a speech as representative of the D.A.R.) On October 16, 1939, Boyce was part of a panel responding to questions at the 59th annual convention of the W.C.T.U. in Berkeley, California. In 1947, Boyce organized The W.C.T.U. Convention Banquet at the Hotel Bellevue, San Francisco, on October 9, 1947.

== Personal life ==
Kepner initially lived in Iowa and Illinois, and then moved to California in 1914 and lived at 10 Corona Street, Ingleside Terraces, San Francisco, California.

In 1905, she married Leroy Porter Boyce (died 1943). They had one son: Robert William.

Boyce died on April 5, 1960, aged 78, and is buried at Cypress Lawn Memorial Park, Colma, California.
