= Etha Izora Dawley Holden =

American educator and club woman

Etha Izora Dawley Holden (1873 - April 15, 1948) was an American educator and club woman.

== Early life ==
Etha Izora Dawley was born in Minnesota in 1873, the daughter of LaFayette David Dawley (1848-1936) and Lois Harriet Mathewson (1852-1918).

== Career ==
Etha Izora Dawley taught in elementary schools before her marriage; since 1923 she took up adult education in Americanization Department of Los Angeles City schools.

She was very active in club work; she was president of South Side Ebell; treasurer and auditor of the Los Angeles District Board.

From 1925 to 1927 she was auditor of the California Federation of Women's Clubs.

She was president of the Los Angeles Audubon Society.

== Personal life ==
Etha Izora Dawley Holden moved to California in 1908 and lived at 2802 S. Western Ave., Los Angeles, California.

On April 19, 1911, Etha Izora Dawley married Warren Jackman Holden (1876-1934).

She died on April 15, 1948, and is buried at Forest Lawn Memorial Park (Glendale)
