= Dorothea Dutcher Buck =

American clubwoman (1887–1983)

- Born: Dorothea Dutcher; July 31, 1887; Milwaukee, Wisconsin, U.S.
- Died: May 9, 1983 (aged 95); Chester, Connecticut, U.S.
- Other name: Mrs. J. L. Blair Buck
- Education: Briarcliff College, Milwaukee-Downer College, Art Students League of New York
- Occupation: Clubwoman
- Spouse: J. L. Blair Buck (m. 1914)
- Children: 3

Dorothea Dutcher Buck (July 31, 1887 – May 9, 1983) was an American clubwoman. She was a president of the General Federation of Women's Clubs (GFWC) from 1947 to 1950.

== Biography ==
Dorothea Dutcher was born on July 31, 1887, in Milwaukee, Wisconsin. She attended Briarcliff College, Milwaukee-Downer College, and the Art Students League of New York. On September 19, 1914, she married J. L. Blair Buck in Magnolia, Massachusetts with whom she had three children. The couple settled in Hampton, Virginia.

Buck was an active clubwoman. In 1926 she was a charter member of the Woman's Club of Hampton.

The Bucks moved to Richmond, Virginia in 1930. There she was a member of the Richmond Woman's Club and served as the president of the Virginia Federation of Women's Clubs from 1930 through 1932. By 1933 Buck was involved as the Virginia representative to the General Federation of Women's Clubs (GFWC). In 1935 she became chairman of the GFWC Budget Committee, then served as treasurer from 1938 through 1941, then second vice president from 1941 through 1944, and first vice president from 1944 through 1947.

In 1947 Buck was elected the seventeenth international president of the GFWC. She served until 1950. During her term she advocated for world peace, and specifically the Atlantic Pact, the Marshall Plan, and the United Nations. As president she visited 48 states as well as China, Cuba, Denmark, Egypt, France, Great Britain, Greece, India, Japan, Korea, the Philippines, and Turkey.

In later years Buck was active in a variety of organizations including the American Red Cross, the Federal Civil Defense Administration as the regional director of women's activities, the Virginia League for Planned Parenthood, and the Virginia United Nations Association.

Dutcher died on May 9, 1983, in Chester, Connecticut.
