= Fanny G. Hazlett =

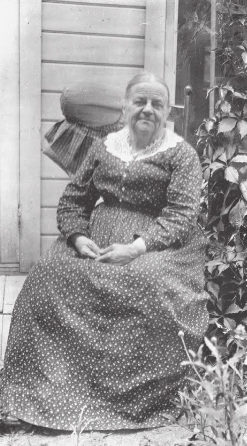
Fanny G. Hazlett

Frances Ann Gore Hazlett (August 31, 1837 - April 3, 1933) was one of the oldest pioneer women of Nevada.

== Early life ==
Frances Ann "Fanny" Gore Hazlett was born on August 31, 1837, in Massachusetts, the daughter of Stephen Gore and Joan Whitcomb.

== Career ==
Fanny G. Hazlett was a pioneer and writer. She crossed the plains from Iowa with her brothers, Charles and Johnny Gore, in 1862 to Nevada in the days of the Comstock Mines. They stayed at Buckland's Station for two days and then moved to Dayton, Nevada. The trip lasted 4 months. Hazlett wrote: "This is mining country and the society is rough... with shooting affrays being frequent and drinking, gambling at every other door... about 20 men to one woman." Her brothers worked in the wood business and Hazlett, first lived with Charles in a tent at a woodcutting camp, with 30 miners and 200 local Native Americans, and then opened a boarding house in the El Dorado Canyon (Nevada), "a cloth-covered frame, about ten by twelve, one-half of one side open for a door".

She contributed considerably to newspapers. She published under the name "Frank Hazlett", since it was difficult at the time being published as a woman.

She was first president and charter member of the Elderberry Club. She was also a member of the Pioneer Society and in 1932 was presented with a certificate by the General Federation of Women's Club for being the oldest American born mother in the state of Nevada.

Hazlett was involved in the Women's suffrage movement in Nevada, and the right to vote for women in Nevada was obtained two years before the national vote. In 1895 she wrote a letter to the editor of the Nevada State Journal: "with the ridiculously small State vote, it seems an opportune time to increase the voting population."

With her daughter Gertrude, Hazlett compiled a history of Dayton, published by the Nevada Historical Society in 1922 as Historical Sketch and Reminiscenses of Dayton, Nevada, and now available at the Dayton Museum. She was the first vice-president of the Nevada Historical Society.

Hazlett was the postmaster of Dayton for twenty years and organized the Helping Hand Library at Dayton. She was one of the oldest women in the world to take a commercial flight in 1922.

== Personal life ==
Fanny G. Hazlett moved to Nevada in 1862, first settling in Dayton, and later, in 1914, she moved to 701 University Ave., Reno, Nevada. On March 18, 1864, she married Dr. John Clark Hazlett (1828-1895) and had one daughter, Emma Gertrude "Gertie" Hazlett Randall (1866-1911), who married the sheriff of Lyon County, Dixie Perry Randall. John C. Hazlett was a practicing doctor, Lyon County Superintendent of Schools, Lyon County's state senator for four years from 1870 to 1874 and Lyon County District Attorney in 1892.

She died on April 3, 1933, and is buried with her husband and daughter at Dayton Cemetery, Dayton, Nevada.
