= Fannie Forbis Russel =

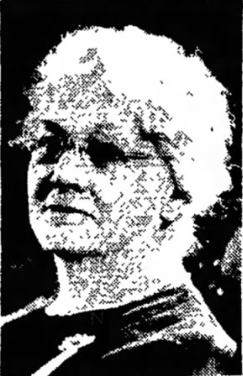
Fannie Forbis Russel

Fannie L. Forbis Russel (November 18, 1846 – July 16, 1934) was one of the pioneer women of the state of Montana.

== Early life ==
Fannie L. Forbis was born in Platte County, Missouri, on November 18, 1846, the daughter of J. F. Forbis. She was sister of John F. and James Forbis, prominent Butte mining attorneys.

== Career ==
Fannie Forbis Russel was one of the pioneer women of the state of Montana, she crossed the plains from Missouri to Montana with her first husband, David LeRoy Irvine. They travelled by ox team in the spring of 1864 and settled in Deer Lodge, Montana. The following year they moved to Virginia City, Montana, at the time an hustling mining camp.

Deeply religious, Russel was always interested in civic, church and club problems; she was active in organizing and building the local Butte Woman's Club. She was also prominent in the Homer Club for many years.

She was a member of the Daughters of the American Revolution and Literary Club.

== Personal life and family ==
Fannie Forbis Russel moved to Montana in 1864. She first married David LeRoy Irvine. They lived in Virginia City for several years, and then moved back to Deer Lodge, the first city where they settled in Montana back in 1864. Irvine practiced law and died in 1872. On July 27, 1875, at Helena, Montana, she secondly married Reverend James Richard Russel (1847-1928), the first Presbyterian minister in Montana. They moved to Butte in 1879 and lived at 849 West Gueste St. (later Quartz Street), Butte, Montana. Reverend Russel founded the churches in Missoula, Butte, Deer Lodge and Helena. They had five daughters: Lialah Russel, Ebia Russel, Theo Russel, Charlotte Hough Russel, France Russel.

Since 1924 Charlotte Hough Russel was the librarian at the Montana State University Law School for 26 years until her retirement in 1950. Law students called her "chief". Before that she was the registrar and librarian at the Montana School of Mines in Butte. She died on July 8, 1957.

Theo Russel, Butte school teacher for 40 years, died on August 8, 1955. She was born in Butte on June 10, 1880.

Fannie Forbis Russel died on July 16, 1934, and is buried with her husband at Mount Moriah Cemetery, Butte.
