= Dale Pickett Gay =

Iva Dale Pickett Gay (June 25, 1891 - 1988) was a Wyoming businesswoman in the oil business.

== Early life and family ==
Iva Dale Pickett was born in Rockford, Iowa, on June 25, 1891, the daughter of John Robert Pickett/Pigott, Sheriff of Lyman County, South Dakota, and Sarah Climena Smith. She had two sisters and a brother.

== Career ==
Gay was the President of Wyoming Federation of Women's Clubs and was active in American Red Cross work and Child Health Conferences.

She was the treasurer of the Coal and Grass Creek Oil Company. The company controlled 1120 acres in the Wyoming Oil Fields.

== Personal life ==
Gay moved to Wyoming in 1911 and lived in Casper.

In 1915, in Denver, Colorado, she married Guy J. Gay, an insurance salesman. They had 4 daughters: Geraldine, Genevieve, Betty Ann, and Helen Eileen.

She died in 1988.
