= Lallah Rookh White Rockwell =

Lallah Rookh White Rockwell (March 12, 1876 – November 9, 1940) was active in educational and civic affairs.

== Early life ==
Lallah Rookh White was born on March 12, 1876, in Lynnville, Iowa, the daughter of John and Mary White.

== Career ==
Lallah Rookh White Rockwell was active in educational and civic affairs. She was an expert accountant.

She was the chairman of the Board of Trustees of the Bellevue School District.

She was the president of the Bellevue Civic Club. She was a member of the State Federation of Women's Clubs.

== Personal life ==
Lallah Rookh White Rockwell moved to Idaho in 1906 and lived in Bellevue, Idaho.

In 1914 she married Irvin E. Rockwell, a member of the Idaho Senate, in Ogden, Utah. Rockwell was married to Mary Luella Searing, and Lallah Rookh White was his secretary. When White joined Rockwell in Idaho, he was still married and their first son was born out of the wedlock. They had two sons, John (1912–1915) and Paul (1915–1920).

Lallah Rookh Rockwell died in November 1940, and she was buried in Portland, Oregon. When Irvin E. Rockwell died in 1952, his ashes were mixed with those of Lallah Rookh Rockwell.
