= Irvin E. Rockwell =

American politician

Irvin Elmer Rockwell (December 25, 1862 – September 22, 1952) was a member of the Idaho Senate.

Rockwell was born Irvin Elmer Rockwell on Christmas of 1862 in Sun Prairie, Wisconsin. In 1884, he married Mary Luella Searing. They had four children before divorcing. Rockwell worked for the Minneapolis Journal until 1886, when he established an office-supply company in Chicago, and he then relocated to Idaho in 1900. In 1914, he married Lallah Rookh White. They had two children. Rockwell died on September 22, 1952, in Bellevue, Idaho. He was a Christian Scientist.

== Career ==
Rockwell was a member of the Senate from 1915 to 1919 and again from 1929 to 1930. He was a delegate to the Republican National Convention in 1916 and 1932.
