= Orpha Woods Foster =

American pioneer and philanthropist (1850–1938)

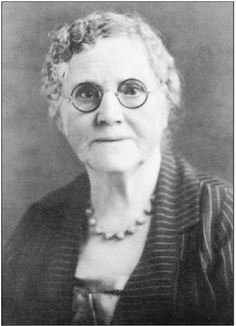
- Foster c. 1920
- Born: April 22, 1850; Avon, Illinois, U.S.
- Died: September 17, 1938 (aged 88)
- Resting place: Ivy Lawn Memorial Park, Ventura, California, U.S.
- Occupation: Philanthropist
- Spouse: Eugene Preston Foster (m. 1874; died 1932)
- Children: 10

Orpha Woods Foster (April 22, 1850 – September 17, 1938) was an American pioneer and philanthropist of Ventura County, California.

== Early life ==
Orpha Woods Foster was born in Avon, Illinois, on April 22, 1850, the daughter of Ira M. Woods (1792-1851) and Orpha Daggett Woods (1810-1875).

== Career ==
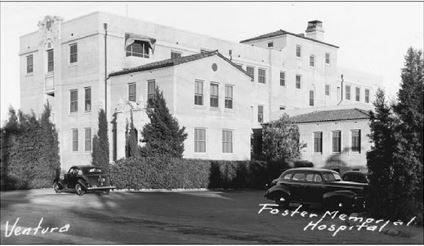
Foster Memorial Hospital

She was active in civic work; she was the chairman on Los Angeles District Board for five years; she was president of the Ventura County Federation of Women's Clubs; she was auditor of State Federation for two years.

She was instrumental in starting and maintaining Cottage Home for needy children, carried on by Big Sisters League. She gave $100,000 to this home ($1,395,560.69 in 2017). She was vice president of the Big Sisters Hospital League, later Foster Memorial Hospital and then Community Memorial Hospital. She donated the park grounds that was to become the Foster Park and Seaside Park to the County of Ventura. With her husband she donated the land for the City Hall and Public Library to the city of Ventura.

She was board member for the Ventura School for Girl.

She was a member of Ebell Club of Santa Paula, Tuesday Club, Avenue Ladies of Ventura.

== Personal life ==
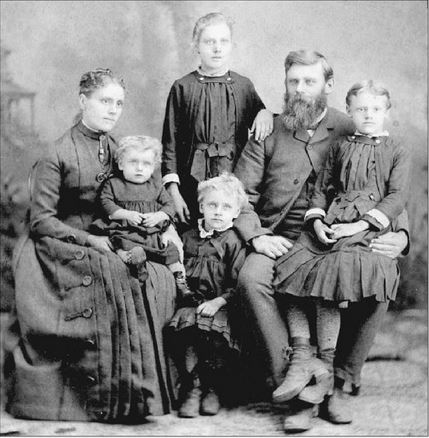
Orpha Woods Foster, her husband and children

In the 1870s Orpha Woods Foster moved to Santa Barbara with her mother, her father died the year after she was born. In August 1874 she married Eugene Preston Foster (1848-1932) and had ten children: Orpha W. Foster (1875-1973), Lucy Foster (1877-1877), Grace Foster Percy (1878-1972), Edith Annie Neel Foster Mercer (1881-1974), Ida Foster Baker (b. 1885), Aleck C Foster (1887-1888), Willis E. Foster (1888-1889), Frank. P Foster (1888-1889), Mildred Foster Ranger Allen (1892-1930), Eugene C. Foster (1895-1903).

With her husband she owned a sheep ranch in the Conejo and in 1877. They moved to Ventura, California, in 1877, and lived in Ventura Avenue. The house burned down in August 2010.

She died on September 17, 1938, and is buried at Ivy Lawn Memorial Park, Ventura, California.
