= Emily Jean Crimson Thatcher =

Music teacher (1868–1960)

Emily Jean Crimson Thatcher (December 15, 1868 – November 22, 1960) was a teacher of pianoforte.

== Early life ==
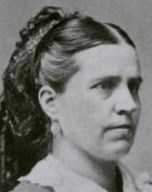
Mary Louisa Tanner (1837-1923)

Emily Jean Crimson was born in Salt Lake City, Utah, on December 15, 1868, the daughter of George C. Crimson (1833–1908) and Mary Louisa Tanner (1837–1923).

She graduated from the Brigham Young College at Logan and then studied music in Boston and New York City.

== Career ==
Emily Thatcher was a teacher of pianoforte. She was the librarian at Brigham Young College; she was the school organist and her home was a center of music.

She prepared students for the great American conservatories of music. She was a member of the Tabernacle Choir.

She was the president of the Utah State Agricultural College Woman's Club. She was a member of the Utah State Agricultural College Women's Faculty League.

== Personal life and family ==
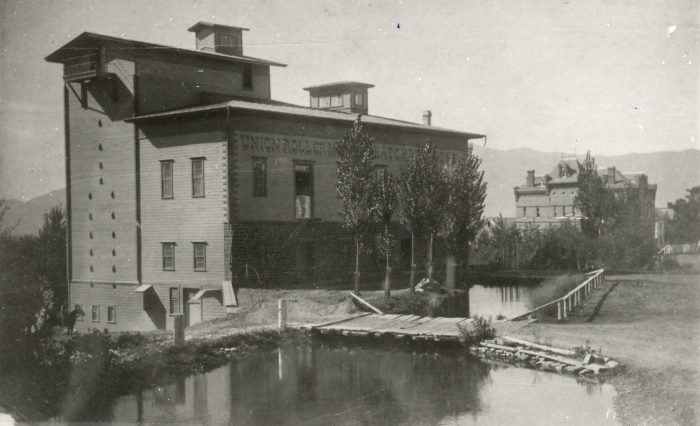
Union Roller Mill, about 1895, 68 West 100 South, The Union Roller Mill was built in 1865 and was later renamed the Thatcher Milling & Elevator Company. In 1888 the millstones in the Thatcher Mill were discarded and steel rollers were installed with an elevator with the capacity of 40,000 of bushels of grain. At the right of the photo is the East Building of the Brigham Young College

On February 18, 1892, Emily Jean Crimson married George Washington Thatcher and had one daughter, Patience Thatcher (1897–1980). They lived at 169 East Center Street, Logan, Utah, which is now a bed and breakfast called the Anniversary Inn.

George W. Thatcher was a noted cultural and business leader of northern Utah. Born in Salt Lake City on August 9, 1866, he died on August 30, 1950. He was the son of George W. Thatcher, Sr., and Luna Young Thatcher and was a grandson of Brigham Young, early leader of the Church of Jesus Christ of Latter-day Saints. He moved to Logan with his parents in 1870 when his father was called to supervise the construction of the ZCMI building on First North and Main streets. They returned to Salt Lake City in 1871, moving back to Logan in 1877. Thatcher attended the University of Deseret (now University of Utah), and later went with William B. Preston, Sr., to survey Afton, Wyoming, and other Star Valley towns. In 1889, he was named director of the Logan fireman's band and in 1893 was elected Cache County, Utah, treasurer. He became well known to patrons of music, having studied in Boston for four years and New York City three years. His specialties were voice and cello. He was the treasurer of the Thatcher Mill and Elevator Co.; affiliated with his brother, B. G. Thatcher, in the Thatcher Music Co.; and became a leader in the local theater field. He was instrumental in starting the old Thatcher opera house which was destroyed by fire in 1912. For many years he was head of the music department at Utah State Agricultural College.

Emily Thatcher died on November 22, 1960, and is buried in Logan City Cemetery, Logan, Utah.
