= Wimbish House =

- Atlanta Women's Club
- U.S. National Register of Historic Places
- Atlanta Landmark Building
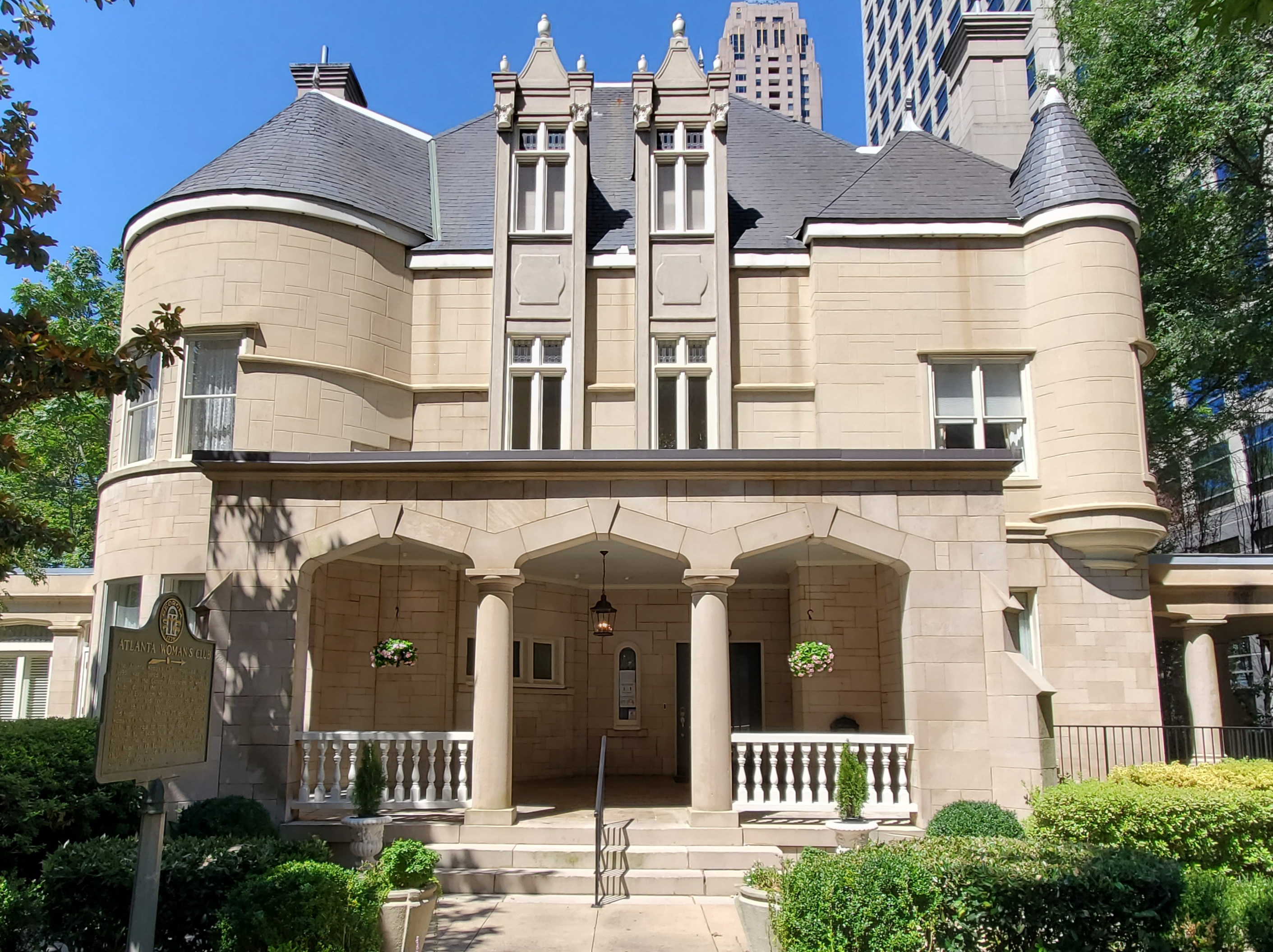
- Wimbish House (2020)

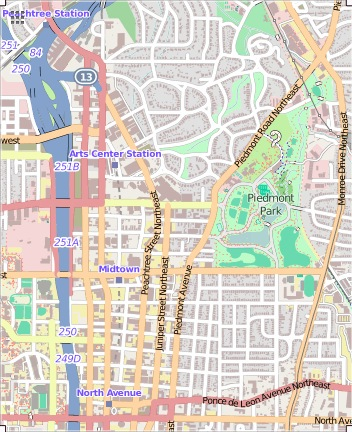
- Location within Atlanta Midtown Location within Atlanta Location within Georgia Location within the United States
- Location: 1150 Peachtree St., NE., Atlanta, Georgia
- Coordinates: 33°47′9″N 84°22′59″W
- Area: 1 acre (0.40 ha)
- Built: 1906
- Architect: Walter T. Downing
- Architectural style: Late 19th and 20th Century Revivals, French Chateau
- NRHP reference No.: 79000718

Significant dates
- Added to NRHP: January 31, 1979
- Designated ALB: March 12, 2002

The Wimbish House is a historic building in Atlanta, Georgia, United States, commissioned in 1898 and finished in 1906. It has been owned and operated by The Atlanta Woman's Club since they purchased it in 1920. The idea for the house came from Mrs. Susie Lenora Wimbish (née Dickinson), after being inspired by the châteauesque style homes she saw in the south of France. It was designed by architect Walter T. Downing. It was listed on the National Register of Historic Places in 1979 as "Atlanta Women's Club Complex". The complex is listed as being in three parts: the Clubhouse, Banquet Hall and the Auditorium.

It has also been known as Peachtree Playhouse and as Community Playhouse. In November 1929, recording sessions of artists including Blind Willie McTell, the Carter Family and Jimmie Rodgers were run by Ralph Peer and RCA-Victor in a building adjacent to the main building then known as the Opera House.

== See also ==
- National Register of Historic Places listings in Fulton County, Georgia
