= Inez Mabel Crawford =

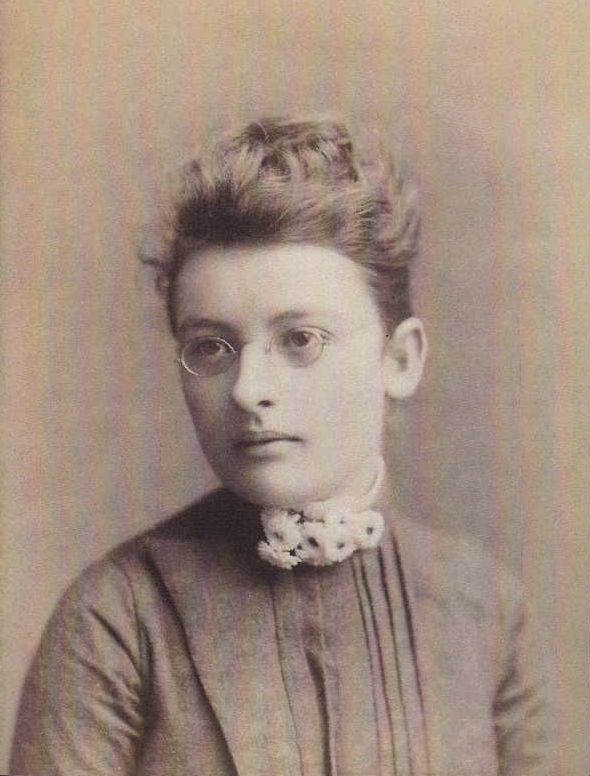
Photographed by A. W. Barker of Ottawa, Kansas, likely before 1900

Inez Mabel Crawford (August 16, 1869 – February 1938) was a prominent socialite in Ottawa, Kansas who moved to San Mateo, California, and worked for many years as the first city librarian and head librarian of the San Mateo City Library.

== Early life ==
Inez Mabel Crawford was born on August 16, 1869, in Ottawa, Kansas, the daughter of Levi Russell Crawford (1834–1897) and Inezette J. Kalloch (1847–1928). She had two brothers, Clarence and Ralph.

== Career ==
Before moving to California, Crawford was the first president of Ottawa Federation of Women's Clubs, and the first registrar of the General Edward Hand Chapter of the Daughters of the American Revolution.

She was the first city librarian and head librarian of the San Mateo City Library in San Mateo, California for 27 years from 1911 to 1937. As librarian, she reduced fines for late returns and adjusted her book acquisitions to the tastes of the community, including romances for the women of the community and adventure novels and mysteries for the men. Beyond her duties as librarian, she also worked towards the passage of a local bond issue that increased the size of the library by a factor of three.

She was a member of the American Library Association, California Library Association, California Book Plate Society, San Mateo Business and Professional Women's Club, and California Artists' Society. She was one of the local "notables" who founded the San Mateo Historical Society in 1935, using her library as its first meeting place. She served the California Library Association as president of its second district and became the chairman of the Art Section of the San Mateo Woman's Club.

== Personal life ==
She moved to California in 1908 and lived at 216 Monte Diablo Ave., San Mateo, California.

She died in February 1938 and is buried at Highland Cemetery, Ottawa, Kansas.
