= Laura Adrienne MacDonald =

American pianist and businesswoman (1887–1982)

- Born: Laura Adrienne Townsend MacDonald; April 16, 1887; Park City, Utah, U.S.
- Died: April 1982 (aged 94–95); La Crescenta, California, U.S.
- Occupations: Pianist; organist; businesswoman
- Years active: 1920s–1969
- Spouse: Rory Q. MacDonald (m. 1910; died 1933)
- Children: 5

Laura Adrienne Townsend MacDonald (April 16, 1887 – April 1982) was an American pianist and a business pioneer woman.

== Early life ==
Laura Adrienne Townsend was born in Park City, Utah, on April 16, 1887, the daughter of Herbert Scott and Elizabeth A. Townsend.

== Career ==
MacDonald was a pianist. She was the church organist at Tonopah, Nevada.

After moving to La Crescenta from Tonopah, she began a real estate business with the development of 50 acres in Highway Highlands, California. At the death of her husband in 1933, the Foothill Boulevard office had grown to include insurance and notary services. She ran the business alone for the next 36 years, retiring in 1969, at the age of 82.

She was the president of Tonopah Woman's Club and of La Crescenta Woman's Club.

She was also the president of the Tonopah Parent-Teacher Association and member of the Lincoln Parent-Teacher Association.

She was a member of the American Red Cross and the Board of Realtors. In 1968, she was honored by the La Crescenta Chamber of Commerce as the "La Crescentan of the year".

During World War II, she had worked the swing shift as a riveter for Lockheed Aircraft Co. after putting in a full day at her own office.

== Personal life ==
In 1910, in Detroit, Laura Adrienne Townsend married Rory Q. MacDonald (died in 1933) and had five children: Jack H., Gordon, Bruce, Scott T., and Roderick Q. From Nevada, they moved to California in 1923 and lived at Highway Highlands, La Crescenta, California.

She died in April 1982.
