= Freda Ehmann =

American farmer

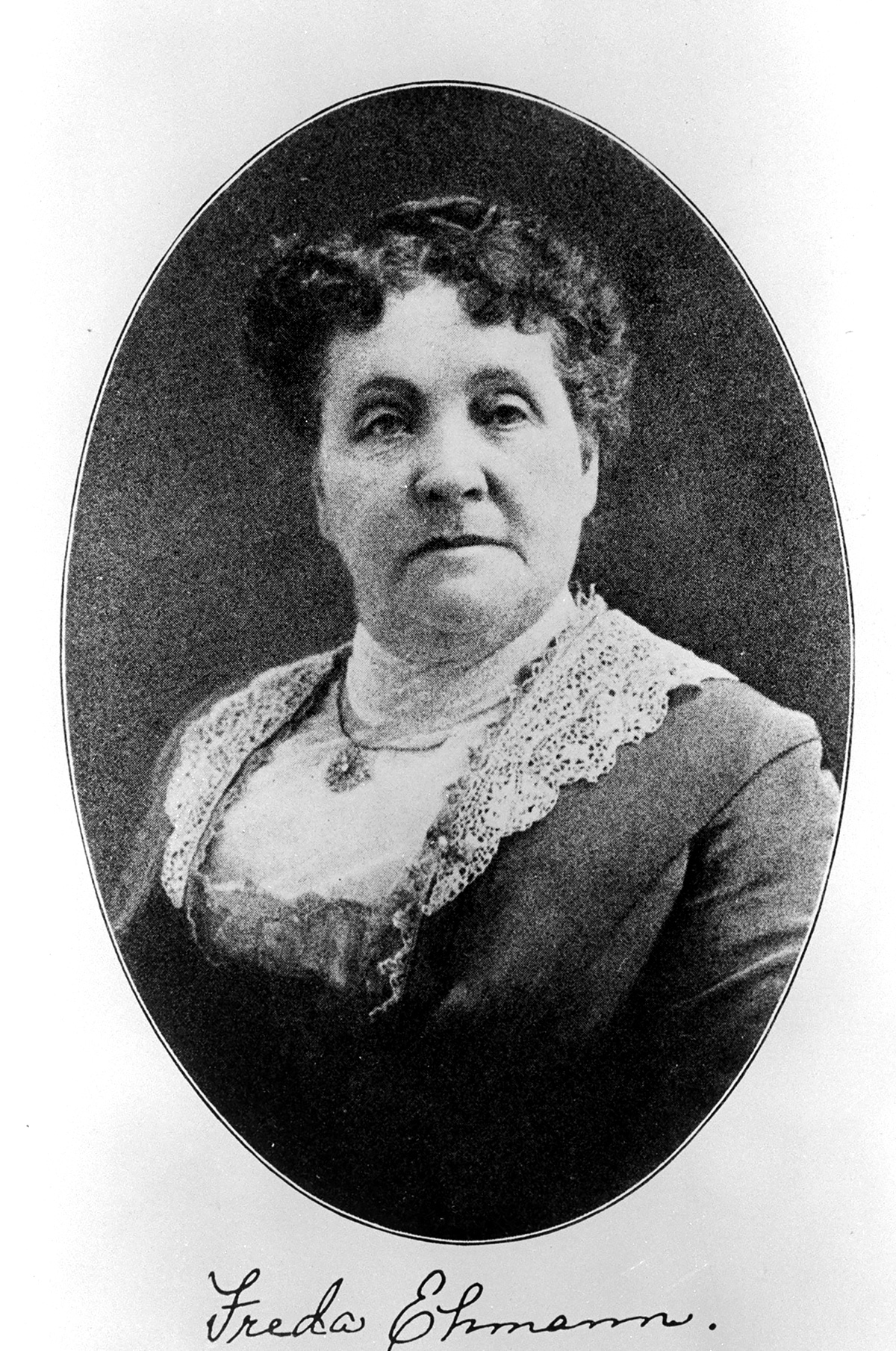
Freda Ehmann

Freda Ehmann (1839 – 1932) was a farmer who has been credited with launching California's olive industry by perfecting a process to preserve the fruit for shipment.

== Early life ==
Freda Loeber was born in Niederuff, Hesse, Germany. She moved to Kassel and immigrated to America with her mother at a young age. In 1856 she married Ernst Cornelius Ehmann, a fellow German immigrant, in St. Louis. The couple moved to Quincy, Illinois.

== Career ==
She owned a small olive grove outside Oroville in the Sacramento Valley, and sought ways to increase her market beyond olive oil. At the time, olives could not be successfully preserved for long-term storage or shipment. Working with a University of California food scientist, she experimented with a number of pickling methods before hitting on a formula that resulted in a marketable product.

She founded the Ripe Olive Industry of California.

Today, Ehmann's home is the headquarters of the Butte County Historical Society, and tours are offered regularly.

She was active in Women's Clubs affairs and was Chairman of the Financial Committee of the YMCA Building Fund.

She was a member of the Oroville Monday Club.

== Personal life ==
She lived in Illinois and moved to California in 1892, following the death of her husband. She had two children: Emma Bolles and Edwin W. Ehmann. She lived at 402 Lincoln Street, Oroville, California.
