= Ellen Sullivan Woodward =

American politician

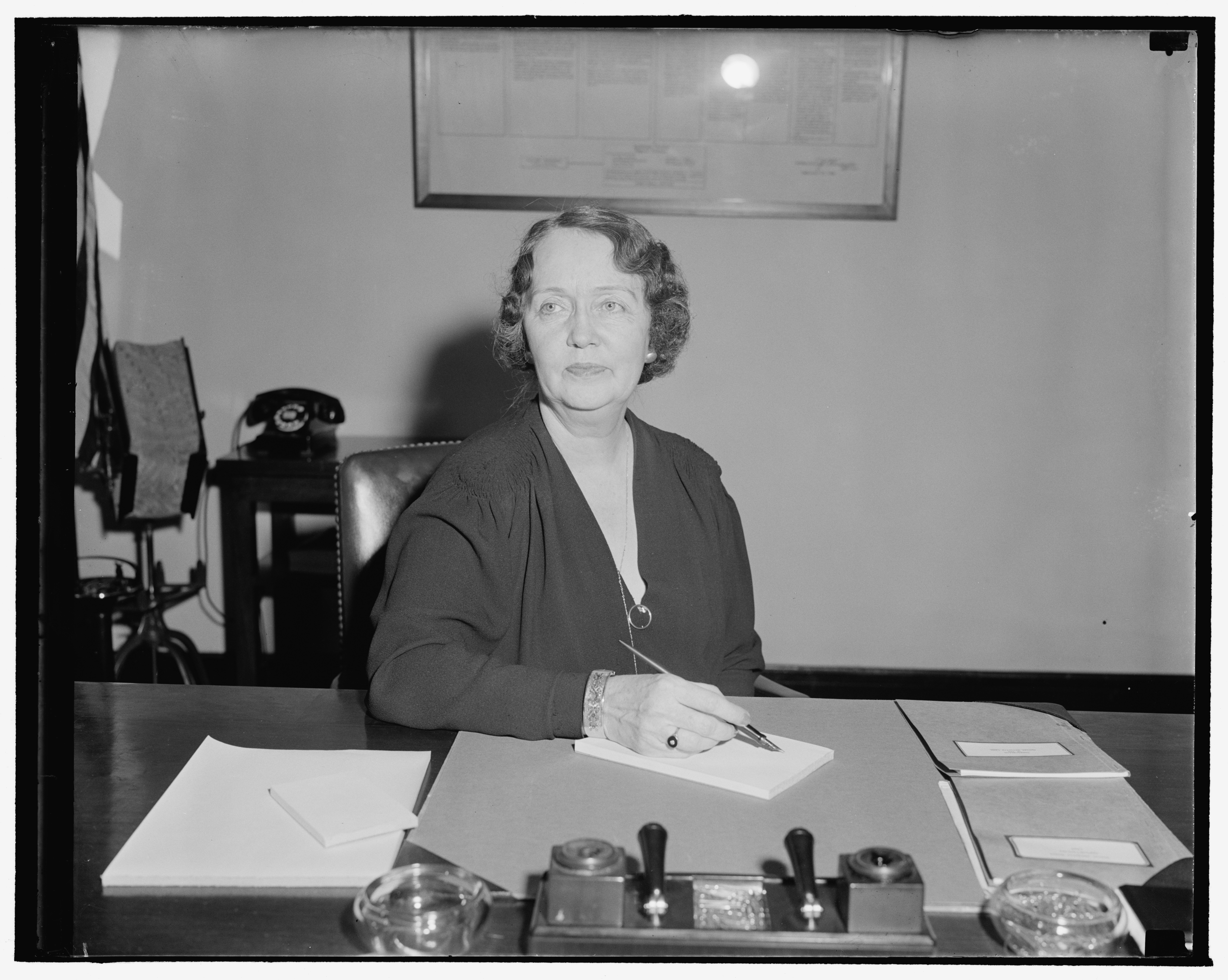
- Born: July 11, 1887; Oxford, Mississippi
- Died: September 23, 1971 (aged 84); Washington, D.C.
- Occupation: Government administrator
- Known for: New Deal work programs for women

Ellen Sullivan Woodward (July 11, 1887 – September 23, 1971) was a United States federal civil servant and a Mississippi state legislator. She served as director of work relief programs for women organized as part of the Roosevelt administration's New Deal in the 1930s and continued to work in the federal government until her retirement in the 1950s.

== Personal life ==
Ellen Sullivan was born in Oxford, Mississippi, on July 11, 1887, to William Van Amberg Sullivan, an attorney who later served as a congressman from Mississippi and United States senator, and Belle Murray Sullivan. She was one of five children. Through her mother's side she was a Daughter of the American Revolution, and through her father's side she was a United Daughter of the Confederacy.

Her mother died when she was seven. She was educated in Oxford, Washington, D.C., and Greenville, South Carolina, and received no formal education after the age of 15. Her father did not want her to attend college. She made her society debut in 1905 at the Chickasaw Club in Memphis.

In 1906, she married Albert Y. Woodward, an attorney and elected judge; the couple had one son, Albert, Jr. in 1909. Ellen was active in her church, the Mississippi Federation of Women's Clubs, and the City Beautiful Association in Louisville. Her husband served in the Mississippi House of Representatives, and he died when Ellen Sullivan Woodward was 37.

== Public life ==
=== Mississippi State Government ===
Ellen Sullivan Woodward's involvement in public life was influenced by her childhood, growing up around her public servant father, and also her involvement in the women's club movement. When her husband died in 1925, she was elected to serve the remainder of his term becoming the second woman to serve as a representative for the state. Until the end of her term in 1927, she focused on policies around libraries, education, and charities. Part of her motivation to run for office was to support her son, but she found that the salary was not sufficient to support the two of them.

Woodward did not run for reelection. She became director of civic development for the Mississippi State Board of Development (1926-1933), running both the women's program and Civil Welfare and Community Development division before serving as executive director for the board from 1929 to 1933. She was also a delegate to the 1928 Democratic National Convention. Woodward also was the executive secretary of the State Research Commission and was on the State Board of Public Welfare.

=== Federal government work ===
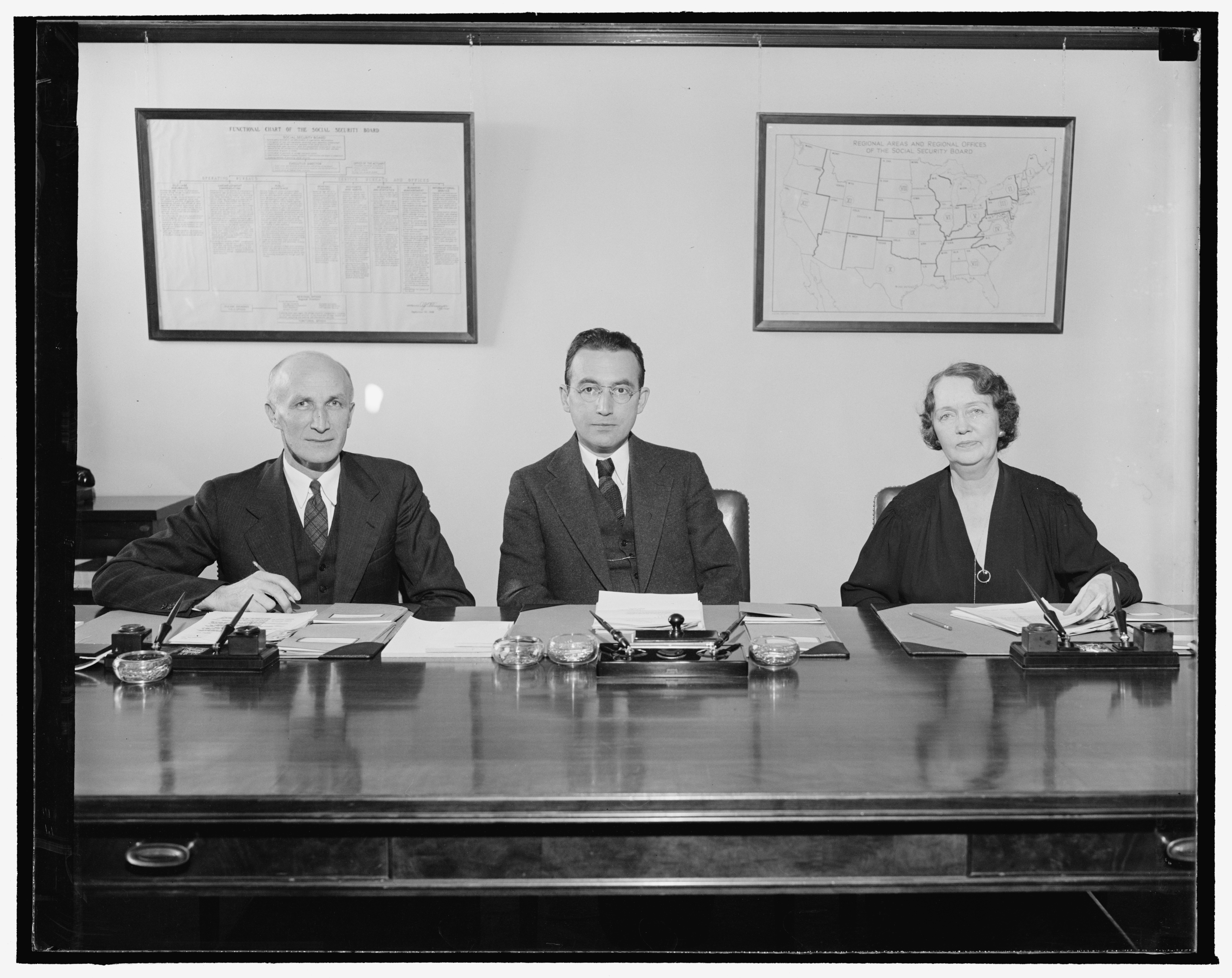
The Social Security Board in December 1939: George E. Bigge, Arthur J. Altmeyer and Ellen S. Woodward

Woodward was the director of the Women's Division of the Federal Emergency Relief Administration (FERA) from 1933 to 1935, a division started through pressure from Eleanor Roosevelt to support unemployed women. Part of her work included creating jobs for women through the Civil Works Administration (created in 1933). Starting these job programs was hampered both because public opinion didn't often see women as the head of the household and had beliefs about which job types would be appropriate for women to hold. Some direct relief was given out, but Woodward preferred training women for jobs instead of giving out direct monetary relief.

Woodward then became the director of the Women's and Professional Projects of the Works Progress Administration (WPA) from 1935 to 1938. At this time, she was noted as being the second highest powered woman that President Roosevelt appointed.

She was a member of the three-member Social Security Board from 1938 to 1946. Woodward believed that standardizing payments between states would assist in postwar reconstruction.

She served in advisory roles to the United Nations Relief and Rehabilitation Administration (UNRRA) and the United Nations Economic and Social Council.

In 1946, Woodward was named director of the Office of Internal Relations of the newly created Federal Security Agency; she retired in December 1953.

=== Recognition and legacy ===
The projects she was involved in within the WPA employed at least 500,000 women.

In 1947 the Women's College of the University of North Carolina awarded Woodward an honorary degree in recognition of her dedication to public welfare in Mississippi, social security in the nation, and domestic and international relief efforts.

Woodward's portrait is part of the Mississippi Hall of Fame located in the Old Capitol Museum to honor her significant contributions to the state of Mississippi.

== Retirement ==
After retiring, Woodward was involved with women's clubs, the Democratic Party, and charitable organizations. She died in Washington, D.C., at the age of 84. Her son Albert Woodward, Jr. died in 1990. Woodward did not leave much personal paperwork behind. Her papers are now held at the Mississippi Department of Archives and History.
