= General Federation of Women's Clubs Headquarters =

Historic house in Washington, D.C., United States

- U.S. National Register of Historic Places
- U.S. National Historic Landmark
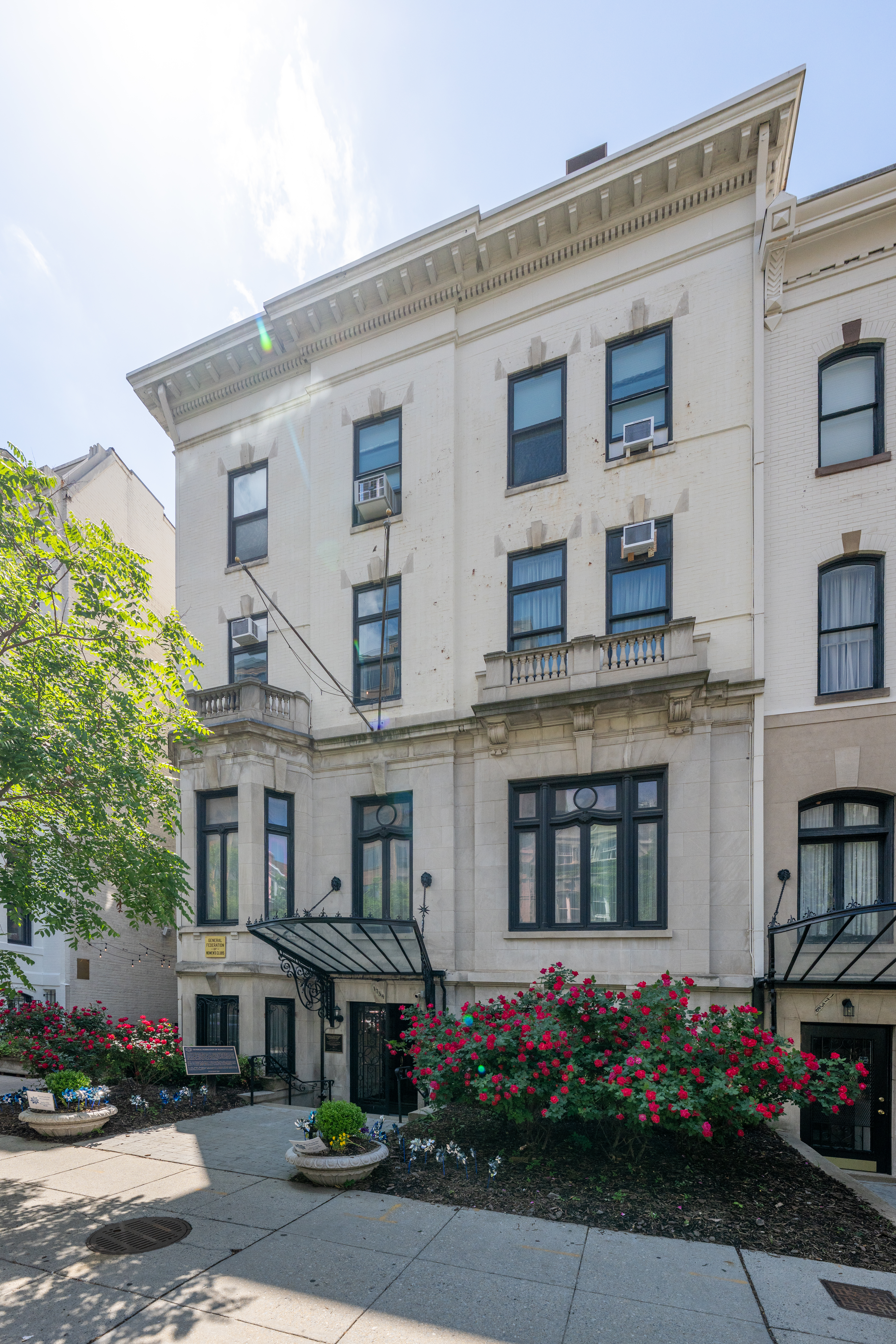
- General Federation of Women's Clubs Headquarters in 2026

- Location within Washington, D.C. Location within the United States
- Location: 1734 N St., NW, Washington, D.C.
- Coordinates: 38°54′25″N 77°2′25″W
- Architectural style: Renaissance
- Website: General Federation of Women's Clubs (GFWC) Headquarters
- NRHP reference No.: 91002057

Significant dates
- Added to NRHP: December 4, 1991
- Designated NHL: December 4, 1991

The General Federation of Women's Clubs Headquarters, also known as the Miles Mansion, is located in Washington, D.C. Built as a private residence in 1875, it has served as the headquarters of GFWC since 1922. It was declared a National Historic Landmark in 1991 for its association with the federation. According to National Women's History Museum, Women's Clubs played an important role in improving education, health social conditions during progressive Era (https://www.womenhistory.org/articles/women-clubs )which serves as an umbrella organization for women's clubs, dating to the mid-19th century. Tours of the headquarters, available by appointment, provide information about the activities of the GFWC and several historic rooms, including the 1734 entryway, the Julia Ward Howe Drawing Room, the dining room, music room and the GFWC International President's office. The headquarters also features changing exhibits of art, photographs and artifacts from its collections.

The house was successfully designated a National Historic Landmark and added to National Register of Historic Places on December 4, 1991, by the United States Department of the Interior/ National Park Service.

== Description and building history ==
The GFWC headquarters is located southeast of Dupont Circle, on the south side of N Street between St. Matthew's Court and 17th Street. It is a four-story masonry structure, built out of ashlar stone in a Renaissance Revival style. The entrance is in a slightly raised basement level, sheltered by a splayed glass and iron marquee with supporting ironwork brackets. The main floor windows are elongated, with paired casement windows topped by transoms, and keystoned lintels. A polygonal bay projects from the first two floors on the left, and a shallower rectangular one projects to the right of the entrance; both are topped by lower balustrades. The interior has been adapted for the GFWC's use, but retains some original finishes.

The house was built in 1875 by Rear Admiral William Radford, at a time when the Dupont Circle area was being developed as a fashionable residential neighborhood. In 1895 he sold the house to the state of Massachusetts, which gave it to General Nelson A. Miles in recognition for his military service. It was next owned by John Jay White, a big-game hunter who traveled with Theodore Roosevelt, and who commissioned the murals by Albert Herter that adorn some of its walls. In 1922 the house was purchased by the GFWC for use as its headquarters, a role it continues to play today. The headquarters also served as an important center for women's civic activism, as organizations like GFWC played a key role in promoting education reform, public health, and community improvement during the late 19th and early 20th centuries. Karen J.Blair , The Clubwoman as Feminist: True Womanhood Redefined, 1868- 1914(1980). https://www.jstor.org/stable/1890029

GFWC, founded in 1890, represents approximately 60,000 GFWC Woman's/Women's/Juniors/Juniorettes clubs nationwide and internationally. Club members are community leaders who work locally to create global change by advocating for women, children, and families on issues such as domestic violence and sexual assault, food insecurity/hunger, and promoting healthy lifestyles. Additionally, GFWC supports the arts, works to preserve natural resources, advances education, encourages civic involvement, and works toward world peace and understanding.

== See also ==
- List of National Historic Landmarks in Washington, D.C.
- National Register of Historic Places listings in the upper NW Quadrant of Washington, D.C.
