= Mary Belle Sherman =

American clubwoman, parliamentarian, and conservationist

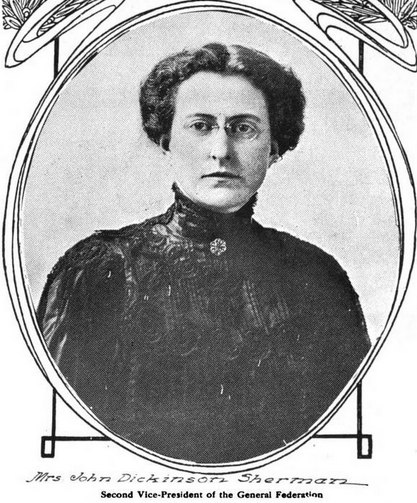
Mary Belle King Sherman, from a 1910 publication.

Mary Belle Sherman (née King; December 11, 1862 — January 15, 1935) was an American clubwoman, parliamentarian, and conservationist who lobbied for the creation of the National Parks system. In 1924, she was elected president of the General Federation of Women's Clubs.

== Early life ==
Mary Belle King was born in Albion, New York, the daughter of Rufus King and Sarah Electa (Whitney) King.

== Career ==
Sherman joined the Chicago Woman's Club on advice from her mother-in-law, already a member. She joined a women's study group on parliamentary law that sparked an ongoing interest in the subject. Soon she was using her new expertise while serving as an officer in women's organizations, including the Chicago Woman's Club, the Illinois Federation of Women's Clubs, and the General Federation of Women's Clubs. She held the position of recording secretary in the national organization from 1904 to 1908, then became vice president at the national level, from 1908 to 1910. She also published a book on parliamentary law, Parliamentary Law at a Glance: A Guide for Club Women and Students (1901), and taught at John Marshall Law School in Chicago. In 1907, she toured the Panama Canal Zone with Federation president Eva Perry Moore.

In 1914, she moved to Colorado to recover from illness and injury, and became determined that the scenic western landscapes that refreshed her should be available to every American. "Every community should have a place in which the people may spend their leisure time", she declared in a 1915 speech at a conservation conference in Berkeley, California, "where they will be brought in direct contact with things of beauty and interest in the outdoor world." She started and chaired the General Federation of Women's Club's conservation efforts from 1914 to 1920; during her time as a lobbyist, the National Park Service was established, and the Grand Canyon became a national park, among other accomplishments. She was made a vice president of the American Forestry Association and a trustee of the National Parks Association in recognition of her work.

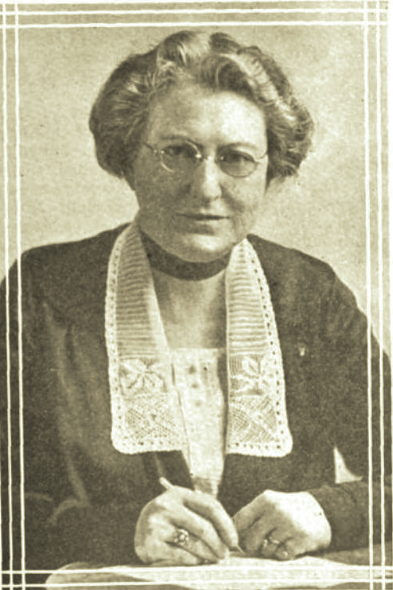
(1924)

During World War I, Sherman worked with the federal Bureau of Education on school gardening programs. From 1920-24, she continued her educational interests as chair of the applied education department of the General Federation of Women's Clubs. From 1924 to 1928, she served as the Federation's tenth president.

During her presidency, she was called upon by the press to opine on subjects weighty and light, including flapper fashions and housework. In 1925, she was appointed to the advisory board of the National Broadcasting Company, and served on the George Washington Bicentennial Commission. She wrote a radio presentation, The Mother of George Washington (1930), as part of that project.

== Personal life ==
Mary Belle King married John Dickinson Sherman, a Chicago newspaper editor, in 1887. She was widowed when he died in 1926. They had a son, John King Sherman. Mary Belle King Sherman died in 1935, aged 72 years, from complications after being injured in a traffic accident.
