= Mississippi Federation of Women's Clubs =

- U.S. National Register of Historic Places
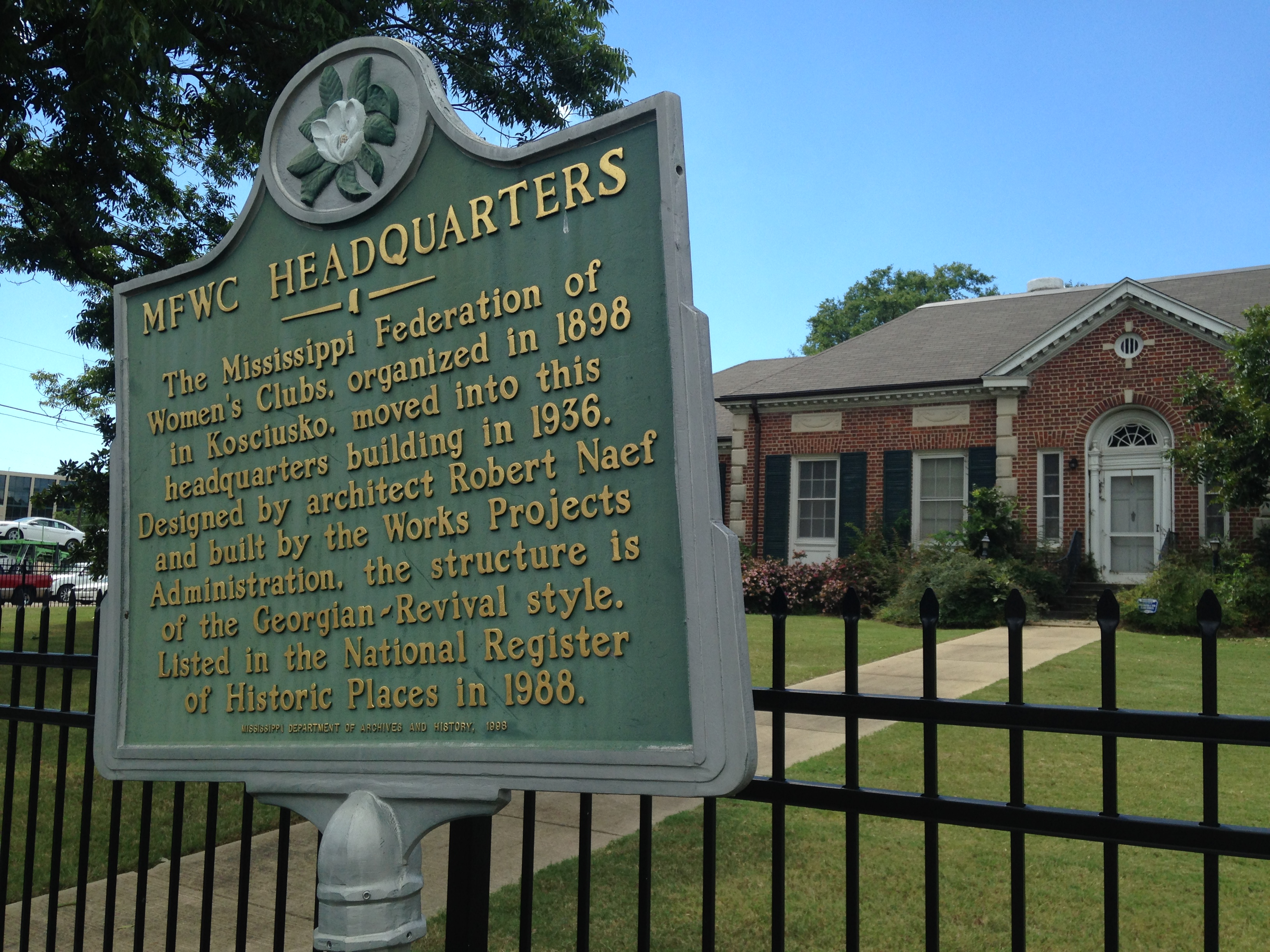
- Mississippi Federation of Women's Club in 2016

- Location within Mississippi
- Location: 2407 N. State Street, Jackson, Mississippi
- Coordinates: 32.327175°N 90.175758°W
- Built: 1936
- Built by: Works Progress Administration
- Architect: Robert W. Naef and Associates
- Architectural style: Georgian-Revival
- NRHP reference No.: 88000975
- Added to NRHP: June 30, 1988

The Mississippi Federation of Women's Clubs Headquarters once housed the Mississippi Federation of Women's Clubs (MS FWC). It was constructed in 1936 by the Works Progress Administration (WPA).

== Mississippi Federation of Women's Clubs ==
The Mississippi Federation of Women's Clubs (MS FWC) is a woman's club founded in 1898. It has been a member of the General Federation of Women's Clubs since 1904. It maintained headquarters in Jackson, MS..

== Building ==
The Mississippi Federation of Women's Clubs Headquarters was built in 1936 as a Works Progress Administration project. It was designed by Robert W. Naef and Associates in the Georgian-Revival style. It was listed as a Mississippi Landmark in 1986 and on the National Register of Historic Places in 1988.
