= Annie Sawyer Green =

- Born: Annie Sawyer; Boston
- Education: Wellesley College
- Occupation: teacher
- Known for: president of the California Federation of Women's Clubs.
- Political party: Republican
- Spouse: William Wilcox Green

Annie Sawyer Green was the president of the California Federation of Women's Clubs.

== Early life ==
Annie Sawyer was born in Boston, Massachusetts, the daughter of Seth C. Sawyer and Meriel White.

Sawyer graduated from Wellesley College.

== Career ==
Annie Sawyer Green taught for several years at Boston High School.

She was the president of the California Federation of Women's Clubs. She also organized the Biggs Woman's Club and held several high offices in Federation of Women's Clubs. She was a member of the Chico Art Club.

She was closely connected with the Farm Bureau work in Butte County and she was the organizer of Home Department there and in the Farm Bureau's speakers.

She was a member of State Republican Central Committee and at one time she was the candidate California's 6th State Senate district.

== Personal life ==
Annie Sawyer married William Wilcox Green and they had three children: William Wingate, Thomas White, Meriel.

Annie Sawyer Green moved to California in 1913 and lived at 403 Plaza Bldg., Sacramento, Calif.
