= Kate Wetzel Jameson =

American scholar (1870–1967)

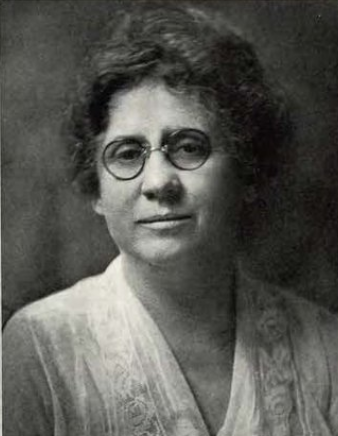
- Kate W. Jameson, from the 1925 yearbook of Oregon State College
- Born: October 15, 1870; Perrysburg, Ohio
- Died: 1967; Toledo, Ohio
- Education: Ohio Wesleyan University and University of Wisconsin
- Occupation: Educator
- Known for: Oregon State University's Kate W. Jameson International Education Award

Kate Wetzel Jameson (October 15, 1870 – 1967) was a professor at several colleges and Dean of Women at Montana State University, the University of Arizona and then Oregon State College.

== Early life ==
Kate Wetzel Jameson was born on October 15, 1870, in Perrysburg, Ohio, the daughter of Jacob Wetzel. She graduated from Perrysburg High School in 1888.

She studied in Leipzig, Bonn, and Wuerzburg and obtained an A.B. in 1905 and an M.A. in 1910 from Ohio Wesleyan University and an A.M. in 1914 and a Ph.D. in 1916 from the University of Wisconsin.

== Career ==
From 1914 to 1916 she taught school in Ohio and German at the University of Wisconsin.

From 1916 to 1920 she was professor of German and Dean of Women at Montana State University and from 1920 to 1923 she was head of the German Department and Dean of Woman at the University of Arizona. From 1923 to 1941 she was the Dean of Women at Oregon State College. She later became Emeritus Dean of Women. She was especially interested in psychology and German literature.

She was a member of the American Association of University Women, Federated Women's Clubs, the National Education Association, P.E.O. Sisterhood, Order of the Eastern Star, and the Parent-Teacher Association.

== Personal life ==
Wetzel Jameson moved to Oregon in 1923. She married Rev. D. H. Jameson and had one son, Raymond Deloy.

She died in 1967 in Toledo, Ohio.

== Legacy ==
Oregon State University instituted the Kate W. Jameson International Education Award. The award was founded by an anonymous donor to the Oregon State University Foundation to assist a worthy and deserving Oregon student to participate in the Oregon State System of Higher Education Japan Study Center.
