= Nannie S. Brown Kramer =

American clubwoman

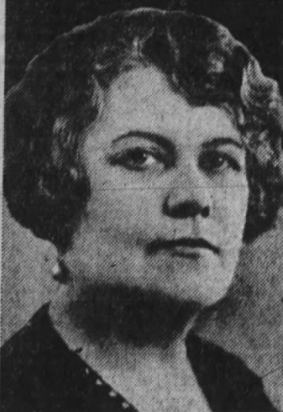
Nannie S. Brown Kramer, 1935

Nannie S. Brown Kramer (1883–1953) was active in club and civic affairs. She was interested in P. T. A. work.

== Early life ==
Nannie S. Brown was born in 1883 in St. Peter, Minnesota, the daughter of Alexander Brown.

== Career ==
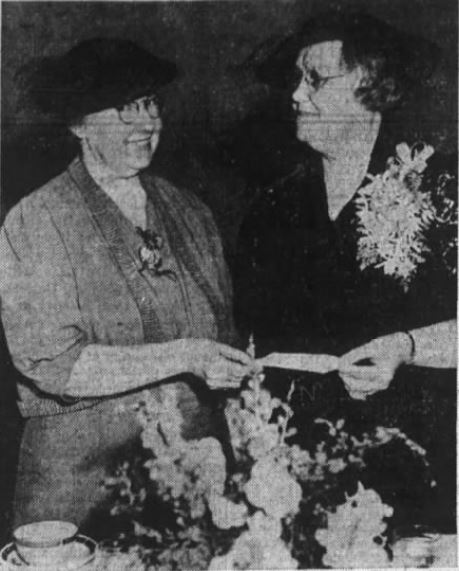
Mrs. Arthur H. Gale, president of Oakland Women's City Club, and Kramer

She was active in club and civic affairs and Parent-Teacher Association work; she held several important offices in P.T.A. organizations, including vice-president of the California Congress of P.T.A. and chairman of several committees, serving two terms as a member of the Oakland Board of Education. She was chairman of Public Health Department of Oakland schools, and was appointed by the State Superintendent of Schools. She was member of the State Committee on Revision of Forms for Registration of Minors. She was director of the Public Welfare League. She was organizer, president and membership director of the Oakland Women's City Club; this club had three thousand members and erected a new building which cost $600,000 ($8,373,364.16 in 2017). She was a member of the Rock Ridge Club and Order of the Eastern Star.

== Personal life ==
Kramer moved to California in 1906 and lived at 5915 Chabolyn Terrace, Oakland, California. She married Peter Joseph Kramer and had on son, Lloyd Ferris Kramer .

She died on August 9, 1953, and is buried at Mountain View Cemetery (Oakland, California).
