= Waurine Walker =

American educator

- Waurine Walker, as a teacher at Waco High School in 1938
- Born: Waurine Elizabeth Walker; June 30, 1908; Tyler, Texas
- Died: July 22, 1987 (aged 79); Austin, Texas
- Occupation: Educator
- Known for: President of the National Education Association

Waurine Elizabeth (or Isabel) Walker (June 30, 1908 – July 22, 1987) was an American educator based in Texas. She was elected president of the National Education Association in 1954.

== Early life ==
Waurine Isabel Walker was born in Tyler, Texas, the daughter of Alonzo "Lon" Singleton Walker and Minnie Lee Rogers Walker. Her father was a railroad conductor. She trained as a teacher at Baylor University. She earned a master's degree from Teachers College, Columbia University. She earned a doctorate in education at Baylor University. In 1955 she was presented with an honorary Doctor of Laws degree at Lindenwood College.

== Career ==
Walker taught school in Mineral Wells and Waco. She was director of teacher relations and certification for the Texas Education Agency. In 1950, she received the Texas State Achievement Award, from the Texas chapter of Delta Kappa Gamma. She was president of the Waco Classroom Teachers Association, and the Texas State Teachers Association.

Walker was elected president of the National Education Association in 1954. As NEA president, she lobbied for federal school building funds, and appeared on television to discuss education issues. She tied many of her policy positions to the arrival of the baby boomers in American public schools, requiring more space and more teachers. She gave keynote addresses at the World Federation of Teaching Professions meeting in Norway in 1954, and in Turkey in 1955. In 1955, she spoke at Baylor University's commencement, saying "Neither free speech, nor a free press, nor popular government nor universal education can long endure without a constantly renewed supply of teachers. Upon the character and quality of teachers the effectiveness of all education depends.” As former president in 1957, she addressed the NEA again, in the aftermath of Brown v. Board of Education ruling on school desegregation: "Fear to speak out on controversial issues seems to be growing," she said, before exhorting teachers to give students encouragement "to raise questions about economic, social and political issues in today's world."

In the early 1960s, Walker was president of the Texas Retired Teachers Association, and worked for the founding of the Texas Retired Teachers Residence in Waco. She was part of a US Department of Defense project to study the education of American military dependents overseas, and toured armed forces schools in Western Europe and East Asia. "We found the Japanese-based American school outstanding as compared to European bases," she remarked, noting further than that the European schools excelled in language instruction.

== Personal life ==
Walker died in 1987, in Austin, Texas.
