= Sabra R. Greenhalgh =

American educator (1877–1969)

Sabra Ann Rickey Greenhalgh (August 26, 1877 – October 13, 1969) was an educator, the first woman to hold a County elective position in Amador County, California.

== Early life ==
Sabra Ann Rickey was born on August 26, 1877, on a farm near Plymouth, California, the daughter of James Allen Rickey (1834–1916) and Charity Olive Alspaugh (1841–1918), pioneers of California. Her paternal grandfather crossed the plains three times, the last trip being in 1850, and around that time the family was among the first settlers in Ione, California. After they lost that land, they moved to nearby Shenandoah Valley, their last destination. Her mother was a school teacher. She had one sister, Effie Rickey (died in 1883).

Rickey attended local public schools, summer schools and then studied privately. She received a teacher's certificate.

== Career ==
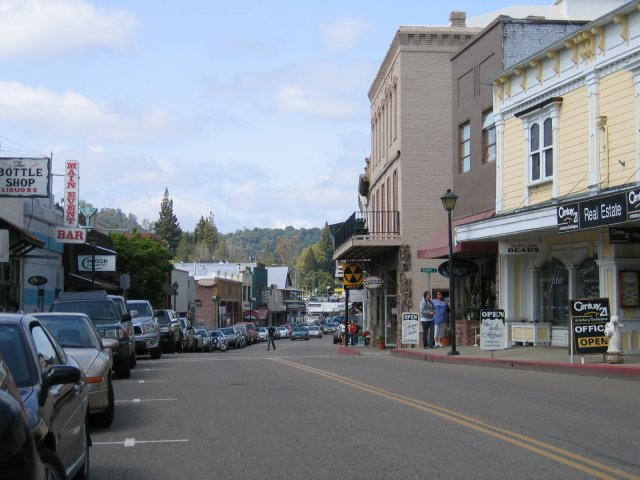
Main Street, Jackson, CA

For six years before her marriage, Rickey taught in rural schools and was a church choir director for ten years.

William H. Greenhalgh was the county superintendent of schools and in 1916 died while in service. Greenhalgh was appointed County Superintendent of Schools to fill out the unexpired term of her husband. She was the first woman to hold a County elective position in Amador County, California. She was the chairman of Child Welfare Committee at Jackson Women's Club.

In 1928 she introduced a system of "Individual Learning and Progress" in the elementary schools of Amador County. She was the past president of Amapola Parlor No. 80, N. D. G. W.

She was a life member of the National Education Association, elected a delegate to represent northern California at the annual convention in Columbus, Ohio, in 1931.

She was a member of the Association of California Public School Superintendents, the California Teachers Association, the Jackson Women's Club, the California Academy of Sciences, the Order of the Eastern Star.

== Personal life ==
On August 22, 1905, Sabra Rickey married William Henry Greenhalgh (1872–1916), county superintendent of schools, and they had two sons: Howard Creighton/Clayton Greenhalgh (1906–1995), a graduate of Stanford University and later an engineer with the Pacific Telephone & Telegraph Company in San Francisco, and Gertrude Charity Greenhalgh (married Henry Ferguson Strachan and then Mr. Dempsey), a graduate of the University of Southern California at Los Angeles.

She lived at Jackson, California and died on October 13, 1969, at Sebastopol, California. She is buried at Jackson City Cemetery.
