= Violet Richardson Ward =

American educator

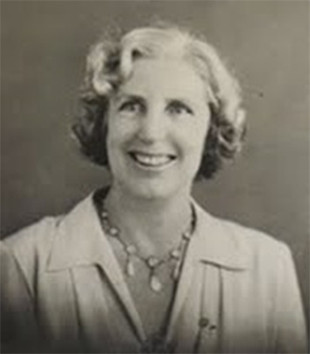
Violet Richardson Ward

Violet Richardson Ward (August 27, 1888 – August 1979), B. A., M. A., was the founding president of Soroptimist International and a pioneer in American physical education for schoolchildren.

== Early life ==
Violet Richardson was born in New Jersey on August 27, 1888, the daughter of John Mead Richardson and Lucy Shipgood, who emigrated to the United States from England in 1885.

She received her early education at home, and then in a number of schools as her family relocated frequently. She received a scholarship to attend the Pratt and Carnegie Institutes of Art. In 1907 the family moved to the San Francisco Bay Area. She finished high school education at the San Francisco Girls High School. After graduation she enrolled at the University of California, Berkeley as an art major, but soon moved to health and physical education. She received a bachelor of science degree there in "physical culture" in 1912 and a master's degree in education in 1917.

== Career ==
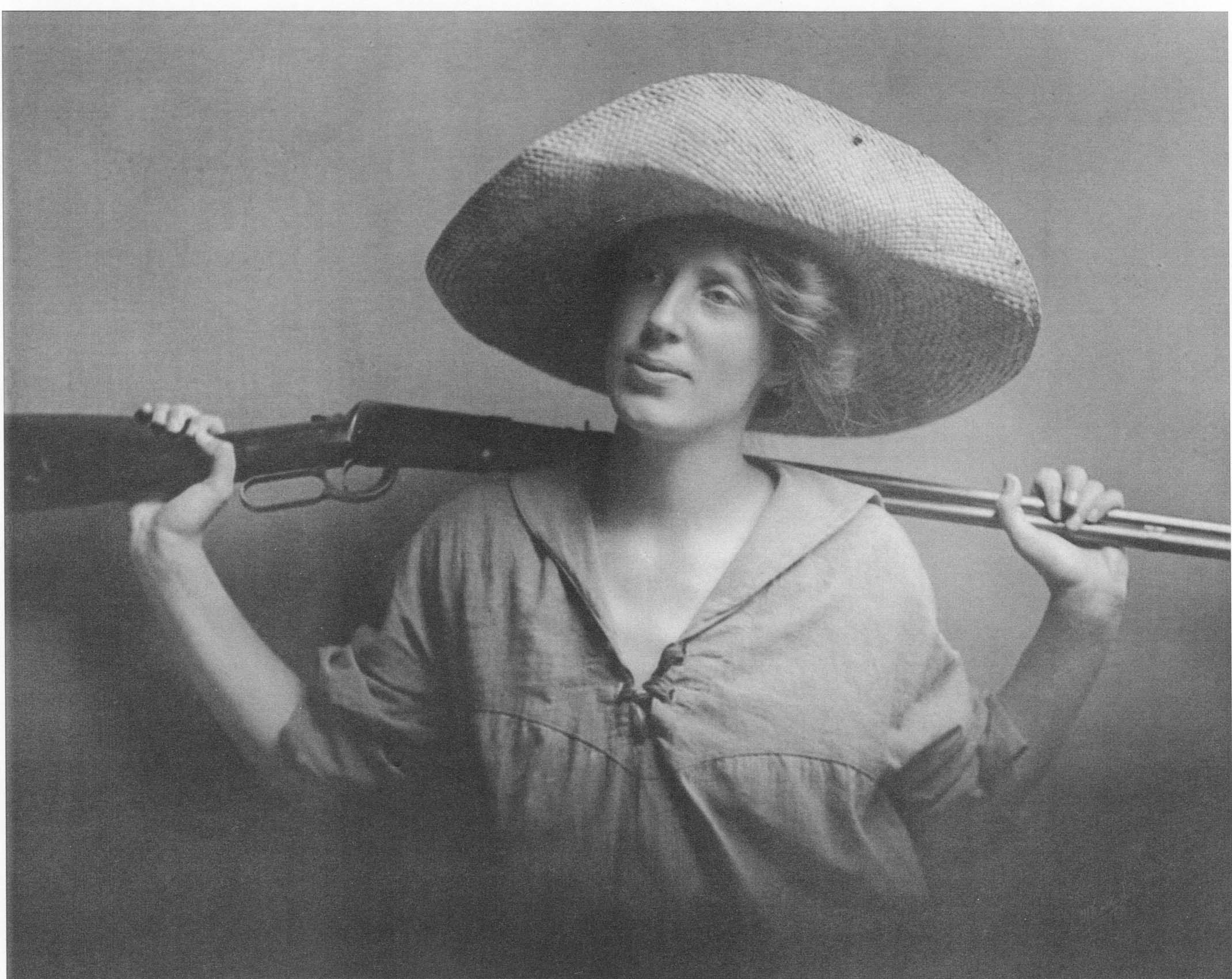
Violet Richardson Ward while a member of the women’s hiking club (the shotgun is for rattlesnakes)

She was the founder of a private gym for adult women, Berkeley Women's Gymnasium, in 1911 while she was a student at the University of California. She also established a women’s hiking club. While in the second year of her master's degree, she began to teach physical education classes to the underclassmen at the university, and substituted in the physical education departments at Mills and Holy Names Colleges in nearby Oakland. As a physical education instructor she fought for equal pay for women.

Soon after graduation, she was hired by the Berkeley School District and remained in that position for 41 years, retiring in 1954. There she introduced mandatory physical education for girls as well as boys from kindergarten through high school. She later served as Director of Physical Education for the entire Berkeley School District.

She was the first president of the Soroptimist Club as a member of its Alameda County chapter. In 1983 Lillian Estelle Fisher published Violet Richardson Ward, Founder-president of Soroptimist. When she retired from the presidency, her parting words were: "Let us continue the work together and with others, toward the development of a better womanhood, a better manhood, and a better citizenship."

She was a matron of the Order of the Eastern Star.

She was president of the local Parent-Teacher Association chapter; she taught American Red Cross water safety classes; she was a member of the Kensington Girl Scout Council, the American Association of University Women, the Young Women's Christian Association, the University of California Faculty Club, the Berkeley Teachers’ Association and the Association of California Retired Teachers.

== Personal life ==
She settled in Berkeley with her family In June 1926 she married Stanley Arthur Ward. They had one son, John Richardson Ward, born in December 1927.

She died in August 1979 at her son's home in Danville, California.

== Legacy ==
The Founder Region of Soroptimist International presents the Violet Richardson Award to "young women between the ages of 14 and 18 for volunteer action such as fighting drugs, crime and violence, cleaning up the environment and working to end discrimination and poverty."

Three streets in Kensington, California are named for her family of origin, who owned land and built houses there: Richardson Road, Marchant Court and Marchant Gardens (Violet's sister Charlotte married a man named Marchant.)
