= Mab Copland Lineman =

American attorney (1892–1957)

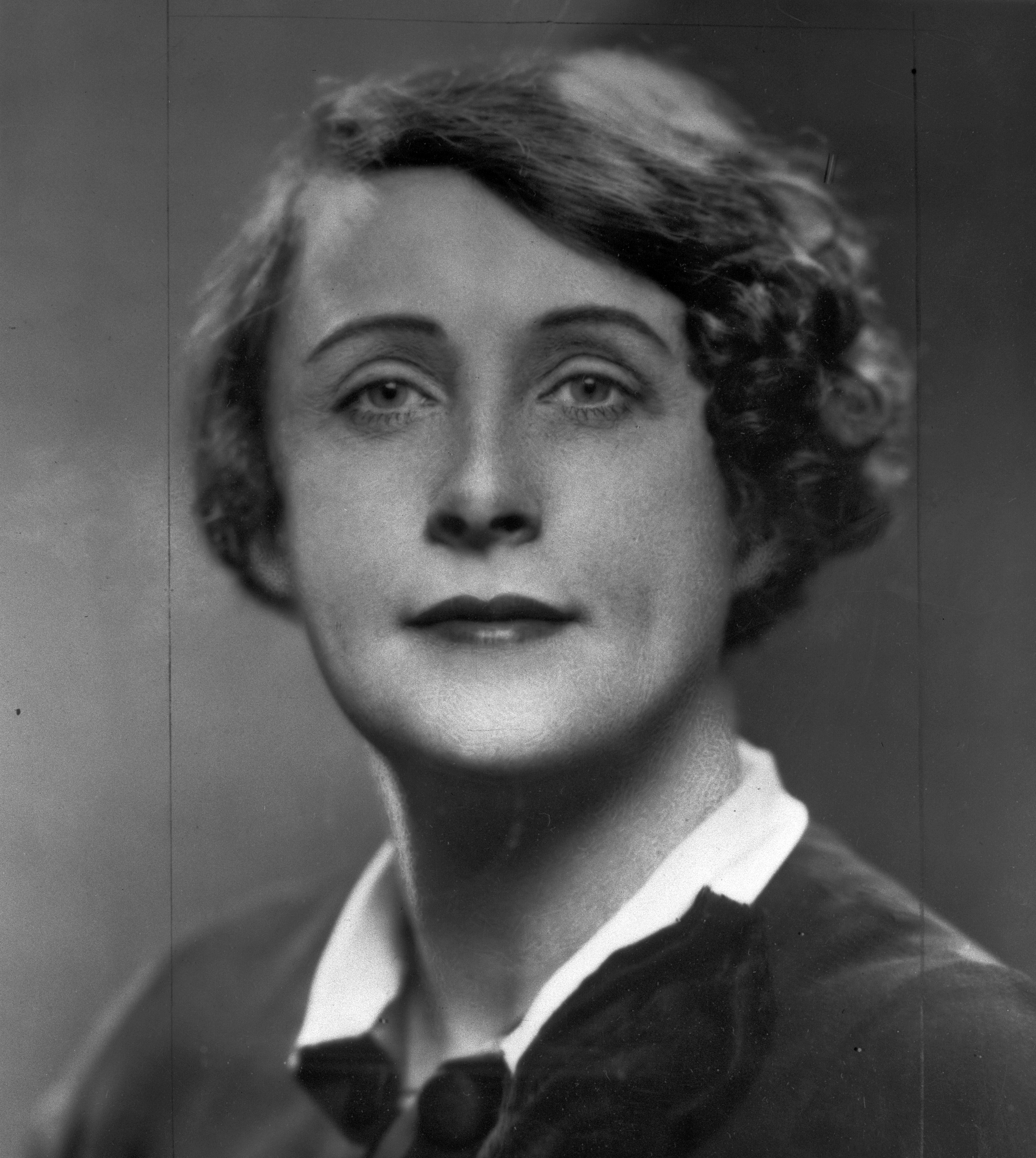
- Mab Copland Lineman, from a 1935 publication
- Born: October 2, 1892; Aberdeenshire, Scotland, U.K.
- Died: December 26, 1957 (aged 65)
- Occupations: Lawyer, clubwoman, lecturer

Mab Copland Lineman (October 2, 1892 – December 26, 1957), LL.B., was an American attorney, noted for her work with business and protective law, commonly known as "Law of Common Things".

== Early life ==
Mab Copland Lineman was born in Aberdeenshire, Scotland, on October 2, 1892. Her father was James Copland, her mother was Margaret Macgregor.

She was educated at Gordon School and Keith, Scotland. She attended Aberdeen College and University of Southern California Law School, graduating in 1918.

== Career ==
Mab Copland Lineman was an attorney at law. She was admitted to the Bar of Los Angeles on December 27, 1917. She was a member of the law firm of H. M. Lineman & Mab Copland Lineman. Her office was at 215 Ferguson Building and later at 630 Bank of Italy Building, Los Angeles.

She was extension lecturer at the University of California and conducted legislative protection classes for several years in Los Angeles. Topics discussed included property law, interest, liability, "disposition of property", and "custody and support of children".

She was the first state chairman of law for the Business and Insurance California Federation of Women's Clubs. She was president and chairman of the Legislation Women's Lawyers Club of Los Angeles.

She wrote Business and Protective Law for Women (1926) and The Law of Common Things in California, the latter an approved high school text book. She was also an attorney for women teachers of Los Angeles.

She was a member of the State Bar of California, Los Angeles County Bar Association, Women's City Club, Order of the Eastern Star, Eleanor Joy Toll Association, Republican Study Club, Women's Political League, Sigma Iota Chi Legal Fraternity. She was the president of the Women's Breakfast Club. Lineman increased the membership to nearly 1000. The main purpose of the Women's Breakfast Club was the day nursery established by Mrs. Buron Fitts. It was located at 2911 Future Street.

In 1939 she addressed the Van Nuys Woman's Club on "Life and Law", "a comparison of business and protective law as it affects women in America and other countries".

In 1940 she was the director of women's activities for the Willkie Volunteers, and she addressed thousands of women in the Southern California in behalf of the candidacy to the presidency of Wendell Willkie. Speaking before a meeting of 300 women in Eagle Rock, California, Lineman declared:

Insidious legislation has created a creeping paralysis on the thinking and freedom of America and today we have only dictated freedom. Are you women going to be silenced as the women of other countries and find yourselves and your children in concentration camps or submitting to the will of one man, or are you going to have the courage which must be now or never to come out and fight for all the woman holds dear?

In 1946, a union strike caused the lack of breakfast at a Women's Breakfast Club meeting, and Lineman, president of the club, led members in opposition:

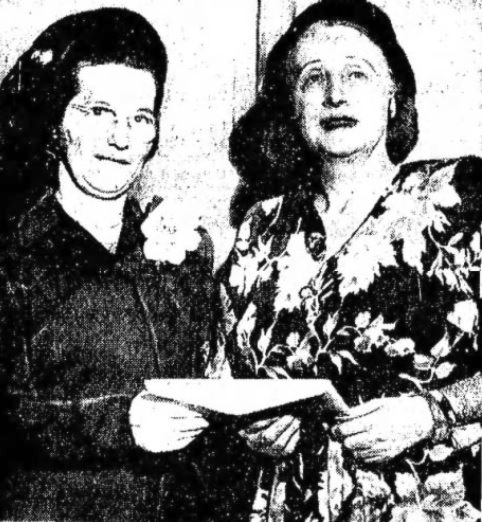
Jeannie Dean Murphy and Mab Copland Lineman

We go on record as demanding that the right of free enterprise be restored in this country; that men and women can work without being forced to belong to a union; that when there is a strike nonunion men and women may work without detriment to themselves or their employers, and that the government enforce such rights to the end that the great majority of unorganized citizens may live normal lives as guaranteed by the Constitution of the United States.

In 1948 she was on the Women's Division essay contest jury for the activities organized by the Los Angeles Chamber of Commerce in connection with the Freedom Train. The subject of the contest was "What I Mean by the American Way of Life" and the first prize winner was Jeannie Dean Murphy, principal of Florence Avenue School.

She believed in the positive effect on society of personal knowledge of individual legal rights therefore she taught classes specifically aimed to women; aided by the Board of Education she had biweekly courses in two different locations, May Co.'s auditorium and Fair Park Ave. Elementary School, Eagle Rock. Moreover in 1938 she hold a contest among students asking to prepare a plan on how they thought it was possible to prevent crime.

== Personal life ==
Mab Copland Lineman moved to California in 1913 and lived at 379 South Reno St. and, at the time of her death, 300 N. Las Palmas Ave., Los Angeles, California. She married H. M. Lineman, LL. B.

In the 1930s she took a trip around the world. In 1936 she moved for one year to her native Scotland, settling in a family estate near the River Tay, opposite the summer home of the Duchess of Athol.

She died on December 26, 1957.
