= Gene Bradford =

Washington State politician

Member of the Washington House of Representatives from the 39th district
- In office January 11, 1937 – August 17, 1937 (died while in office) Serving with W. O. Dolsen
- Preceded by: L. C. Freese; Bertel J. McCarty
- Succeeded by: Robert Bernethy; Oscar Wenberg

Personal details
- Born: 1909 Wisconsin, U.S.
- Died: August 17, 1937 (aged 27–28) Redmond, Washington, U.S.
- Party: Democratic
- Education: Northwestern University

Gene L. Bradford (1909 – August 17, 1937) was an American politician who served as a member of the Washington House of Representatives in 1937. She represented Washington's Washington's 39th legislative district as a Democrat.

Bradford was born in Wisconsin in 1909 but raised in Iowa. She studied at Northwestern University in Evanston, Illinois.

Her legislative district served Snohomish and Island Counties, and she lived in Everett, Washington. She was a member of the Daughters of the American Revolution and the Order of the Eastern Star, a Masonic organization.

She died in an automobile crash during her first year in office at the age of just 27 or 28. She was riding at the time with State Representative Clyde U. Taylor and his wife.
