= Kate M. Ainey =

President and chairman

- Born: August 8, 1865; Des Moines, Iowa, U.S.
- Died: December 29, 1948 (aged 83)
- Known for: President of the Portia Club and the chairman of the Home Economics Committee of the Idaho State Grange.

Catherine "Kate" M. Ainey (August 8, 1865 - December 29, 1948) was the President of the Portia Club and the chairman of the Home Economics Committee of the Idaho State Grange.

== Early life ==
Ainey was born near Des Moines, Iowa, on August 8, 1865, the daughter of Reverend George R. Baker (1818-1881) and Elizabeth Schultz Baker (1821-1888).

== Career ==
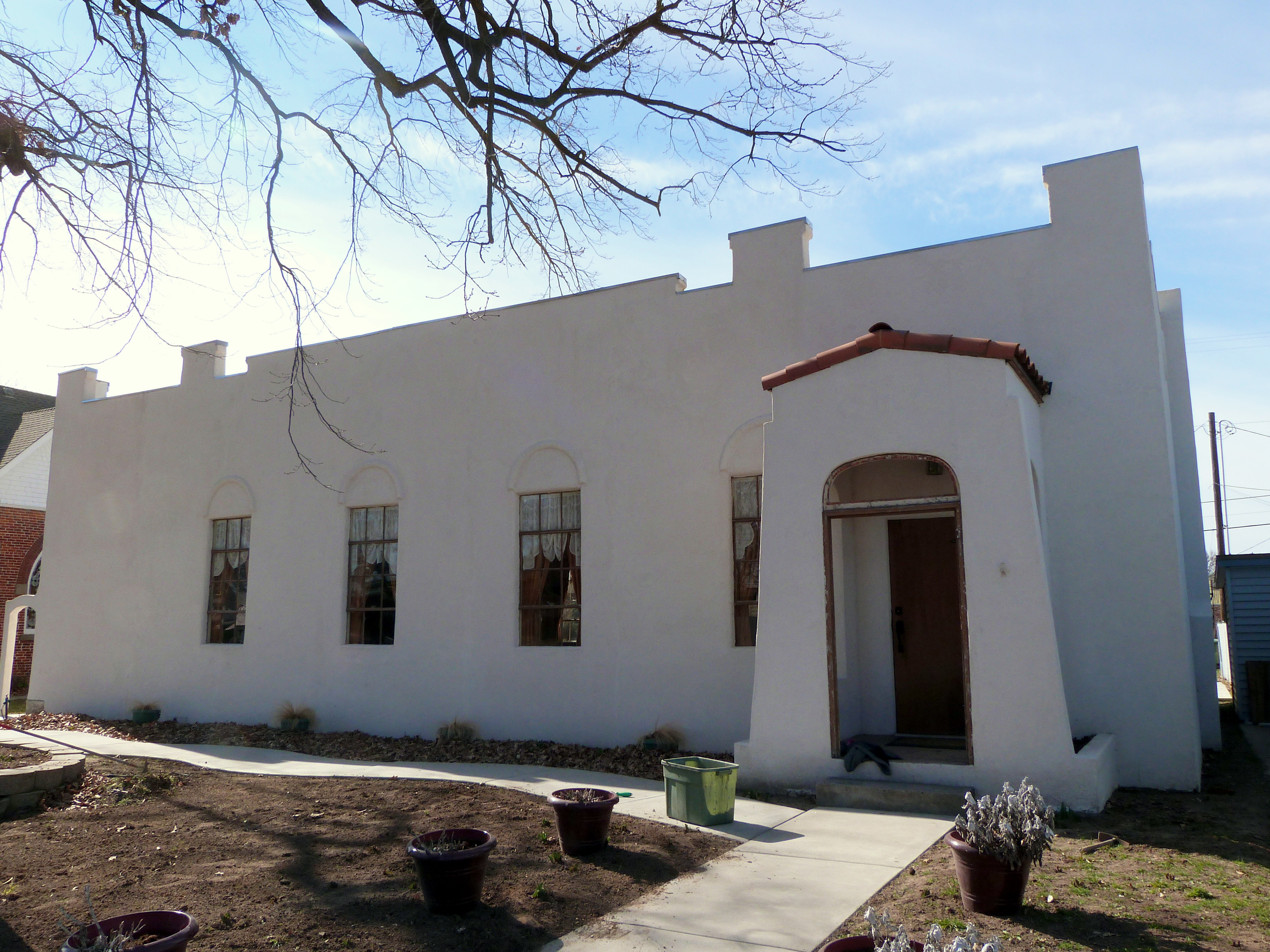
Portia Club, Payette Idaho

She was the President of the Portia Club; The Portia Club first opened on November 1, 1927, at 225 North 9th Street, Payette, Idaho. The clubhouse served as a center of social activity for more than 50 years, but the women who founded it are almost forgotten. In February 2005, the ownership of the Portia Club passed to The Friends of the Portia Club, who reoped the club to the public and the clubhouse is included in the National Register of Historic Places listings in Payette County, Idaho.

She was the chairman of the Home Economics Committee of the Idaho State Grange.

She was a member of the Parent-Teacher Association and Order of the Eastern Star.

== Personal life ==
Ainey moved to Idaho in 1902 and lived at R. R. No. 1, Payette, Idaho. She married Daniel Webster Ainey (1856-1937) and had four children: Marcus T. Ainey (who died young), Gladys L. Ainey, Ione Claire Ainey Whalen (1892-1971), Pauline Ainey Peck (1895-1980).

She died on December 29, 1948, and is buried at Riverside Cemetery, Payette.
