= Vesta C. Muehleisen =

American educator

Vesta C. Gates Muehleisen
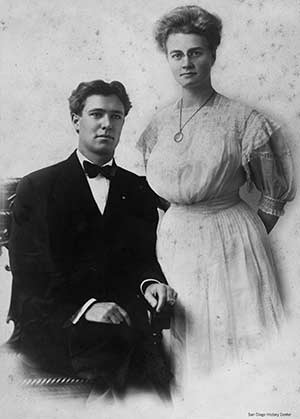
- Adolph Muehleisen and[Vesta C. Gates Muehleisen after their wedding in 1908. (San Diego History Center photo)
- Born: 7 August 1889; Tabor, Iowa, United States
- Died: 19 October 1973 (aged 84); San Diego, California, United States
- Occupations: Educator, founder of San Diego State University Alumni Association
- Known for: Founder and first president of San Diego State University Alumni Association; Parent-Teacher Association leader; Education director for California Pacific International Exposition
- Spouse: Adolph Muehleisen
- Children: Dolf Edward Muehleisen, Gene Sylvester Muehleisen

Vesta C. Gates Muehleisen (August 7, 1889 - October 19, 1973) was an American educator and founder of the San Diego State College Alumni Association.

== Early life ==
Vesta C. Gates was born on August 7, 1889, in Tabor, Iowa, the daughter of Henry E. Gates and Nettie Fox.

She was graduated in 1907 with an A.B. from San Diego Normal School.

== Career ==
Vesta C. Muehleisen was an elementary school teacher, a member of the San Diego City Board of Education and taught for several years in California Schools.

She held several executive offices in the National Congress of the Parent-Teacher Association. She taught a Summer Session Course on the P.T. movement in the San Diego State College, the first course ever given in this state. She was a member of the 9th District California Congress PTA.

She was president of the Scottish Rite Woman's Club.

In 1931 she founded the San Diego State College Alumni Association and became its first president. She helped found the Alpha Phi Delta, a local sorority on campus. Edward L. Hardy, the second president of the San Diego State Teachers College, named her on the citizens advisory council formed to assist in identifying a suitable site where to move the institution. Muehleisen was highly criticized for having recommended moving the Teachers College to a remote undeveloped site east of San Diego.

She was Director of Education for the 1935-1936 California Pacific International Exposition in San Diego. She served with the same role for the 1939–1940 Golden Gate International Exposition in San Francisco. For eight years she was executive secretary of the San Diego Healing Society.

She was a member of the Daughters of the Nile, San Diego Athletic Club, Community Welfare Council, Morning Choral Club, Order of the Eastern Star, National Education Association.

== Personal life ==
Vesta C. Muehleisen moved to California in 1891 and lived at 1501 Vine St., San Diego, California. In 1908 she married Adolph Muehleisen and had two children: Dolf Edward (a champion tennis player, see NCAA Division I Men's Tennis Championship and NCAA Men's Tennis Championship and a decorated general in charge of the North American Air Defense Command) and Gene Sylvester (a captain in both the U.S. Naval Reserve and the San Diego Police Department). Her nephew, Bud Muehleisen, is credited with popularizing the racquetball and is the first person to be inducted into the Racquetball Hall of Fame.

She died on October 19, 1973, in San Diego, California.
