= Beatrice A. Pedersen =

Beatrice Anderson Pedersen (November 6, 1880 – March 1, 1968) was an educator, the president of Utah Agricultural College Faculty Women's League.

== Early life and family ==
Beatrice Anderson was born in Salt Lake City, Utah, on November 6, 1880, the daughter of Robert R. Anderson and Elizabeth Holland. Her grandfather was John Anderson (1805, Leith, Firth of Forth, Scotland - 1888, Salt Lake City) who immigrated to Utah in 1863; he married Jane Russell (born 1807), daughter of Jeannette Morrison of Denny, Loanhead, Scotland. John Anderson was a missionary in Scotland for 23 years, a high priest, a block teacher, a Sunday school teacher, a home missionary and a shoemaker.

== Career ==
Beatrice A. Pedersen was a school teacher.

Pedersen was the president and secretary of Utah Agricultural College Woman's Club, and president of Utah Agricultural College Faculty Women's League.

For one year Pedersen was the secretary of Parent-Teacher Association.

Pedersen was active in all civic and club affairs.

== Personal life ==
Beatrice A. Pedersen moved to Logan, Utah, in 1907 and lived at 358 N. Fourth St., Logan, Utah.

Beatrice Anderson married Neils Alvin Pedersen (1879-1968), emeritus dean of the College of Arts and Science at Utah State University: from 1907 until 1945 he served as professor of English at Utah State and was widely known as an authority on the works of Shakespeare. They had 5 daughters: Faye, Jean, Trix, Troy, Elizabeth "Betty" Tacohy. Pedersen's nephew, Dr. Donald MacLean Switz, son of Theodore M. Switz, married Elise Hurd, daughter of Edward A. Hurd.

The Pedersens retired to San Marino, California in 1962. Beatrice Anderson died on March 1, 1968.
