= Parent–teacher association =

Group that facilitates parental participation in a school

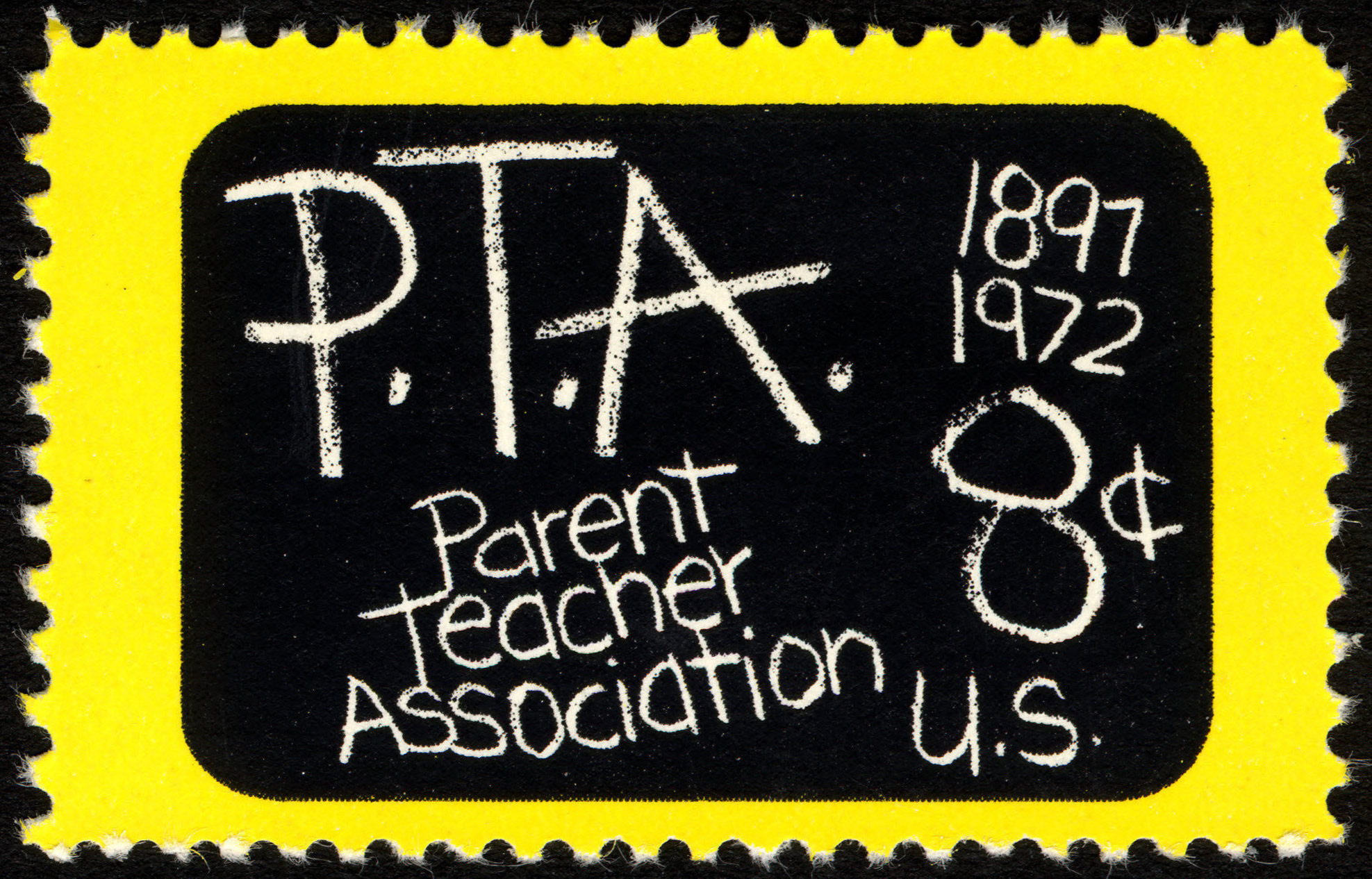

A parent–teacher association (PTA), parent-teacher organization, (PTO), or parent–teacher–friend association (PTFA), is a formal organization comprising parents, teachers and staff which is intended to facilitate parental participation, fundraising, and support for a school. A parent–teacher–student association (PTSA) additionally invites students to participate and give input. There are various forms of parental involvement in education around the world.

The Declaration on Christian Education issued by the Catholic Church in 1965 referred to associations of parents as enabling parents to "further with their assistance all the work of the school but especially the moral education it must impart".

== Australia ==
In Australia, parents and citizens' associations are overseen by both state and national organizational bodies.

== India ==
=== National Policy on Education, 1986 ===
A 1992 'Program on Action' for the 1986 National Policy on Education encouraged giving pre-eminence to people's involvement, including the association of non-governmental and voluntary efforts.

=== Government schemes ===
Government education schemes such as Rashtriya Madhyamik Shiksha Abhiyan (RMSA) and Sarva Shiksha Abhiyan (SSA) have advocated for community mobilization and involvement. RMSA dictates that every school should have a PTA, School Development Management Committees (SDMCs) should co-exist with PTAs and leverage their functions, PTAs should conduct meetings at least once a month and present SDMCs with a register of complaints, suggestions, and actions taken. From 2013 to 2014, 37.54 percent of schools in India had a PTA. A 2010 study suggested that 50% of parents in rural areas and 45% in urban areas were aware of the existence of school PTAs.

=== State guidelines ===
==== Maharashtra ====
In 1996, the Maharashtra government declared PTAs mandatory for all schools within the state. By 2014, 50% of the schools had a PTA. State guidelines for PTAs include:

- The parents of every student shall be members of a PTA
- The PTA does not interfere in the day-to-day administration of the schools
- 50% of PTA members should be women
- The duties of the PTA committee should involve assisting the school in planning and organizing educational programs, monitoring the completion of syllabi, and collecting/presenting information regarding school fees

==== Delhi ====
The government of Delhi made PTAs mandatory in government-aided and private unaided schools. All parents are members of the PTA. Elections should be held every other year, and the PTA should hold a general meeting at least once a year. 78.21% of the schools in Delhi have a PTA.

==== Madhya Pradesh ====
Decentralization of school management was promoted through the installation of PTAs under Sarva Siksha Abhiyan. A 2016 government report stated that 25% of parents were aware of the existence of PTAs, 43% of schools had PTAs, and 39% of PTAs met regularly.

==== Tamil Nadu ====
Tamil Nadu government policy dictates that PTAs should work towards pupil enrolments and attendance as well as assist in enhancing the quality of teaching and learning.

=== PTAs in India ===
A 2010 survey of parents of schoolchildren for the government of India reported that 50% of respondents were aware of PTAs or MTAs (Mother Teacher Associations) and 16% were members.

State	Aware of PTA (%)	Members of PTA (%)	Willing to join PTA (%)
Andhra Pradesh	62.5	20.0	60.8
Assam	55.8	9.17	90.8
Bihar	85.0	26.7	80.8
Chandigarh	70.0	10.0	45.0
Haryana	22.5	5.0	41.4
Himachal Pradesh	40.0	17.1	36.2
Rajasthan	43.3	9.2	33.3
Uttar Pradesh	10.6	12.4	18.2
West Bengal	60.0	15.0	58.7
All states	50.3	16.2	55.5

== Japan ==
=== History ===
When the modern school system was introduced to Japan during the Meiji period (1868–1912), the cost of establishing and maintaining each school was considered to be mainly borne by town and village expenses, but school budgets were not necessarily abundant. To reduce the financial and labor burden on school management, many voluntary groups such as Parents Association and Mothers' Association were formed by parents of students attending school and residents of school districts.

Since the Showa 10's (1935), due to the intensification of World War II and the subsequent confusion, group activities had stagnated temporarily. After the end of the war, the activities started again. Activities and movements anticipating the spirit of the later PTA were also attempted across various locations.

In the spring of Showa 21 (1946), the Supreme Commander for the Allied Powers announced the Report of the United States Education Mission to Japan. In the report, ideas that extend to the PTA were presented. In October Showa 27 (1952), the Japan Parents and Teachers National Association Formation Conference was held in Tokyo, and the Japan PTA National Assembly was formed.

== United Arab Emirates ==
There are plans to organize a PTA in the United Arab Emirates at government schools such as ATHS (Applied Technology High School).

== United Kingdom ==
In the United Kingdom, parent–teacher associations are common and present in the majority of schools. They are sometimes referred to as home school associations, or may include "friends" in their titles and statements of purpose. A 2007 NFER study found that 83% of primary schools in England and Wales and 60% of secondary schools had a "PTA or equivalent".

In England, Wales and Northern Ireland, PTAs may choose to join Parentkind, which describes itself as "the national charity representing over 13,750 PTAs across England, Wales and Northern Ireland" that seeks "to advance education by encouraging the fullest co-operation between home and school, education authorities, central government and all other interested parties and bodies". Unlike the USA, the fact that a body is called a PTA does not, in itself, imply membership with any national organization. There is a separate, similar body for Scotland entitled "The Scottish Parent Teacher Council".

PTAs are generally not involved in the management of schools – this is a matter for the school governing bodies — but in practice, parents who are active in the PTA will tend to engage in the election of parent representatives (parent governors).

== United States ==
=== PTA ===
In the U.S., PTAs are part of the National Parent Teacher Association, a non-profit organization based in Alexandria, Virginia.

Most public and private elementary and middle schools have either a PTA (public schools only), a parent–teacher organization (PTO), or an equivalent local organization. These organizations also exist, although less frequently, at high schools and preschools. Every person who joins a local PTA automatically becomes a member of both the state's PTA and National PTA. PTA membership – including the number of affiliated units and of individual members – has been declining for several decades.

Today, there are 54 PTA congresses: U.S. states, the District of Columbia, the U.S. Virgin Islands, Puerto Rico and Europe (military families, through the U.S. Department of Defense). There are 23,000 local organizations recognized by the National PTA in the United States.

=== National Congress of Colored Parents and Teachers ===
The National Congress of Colored Parents and Teachers was founded by Selena Sloan Butler in 1926. Butler's work began as a statewide association in Georgia, modeled closely after the all-white PTA. Just as the National Congress of Mothers, the NCCPT fought for equal opportunities for all students, regardless of race. The organization eventually grew large enough to put out a publication discussing their concerns and goals as an organization.

A similar organization was founded specifically for colored parents in teachers in Topeka, Kansas, called the Topeka Council of Colored Parents and Teachers (TCCPT), which fought the integration of schools following the Brown v. Board of Education decision. Colored parents and teachers in Topeka fought for the right of equal opportunities not only for their students but also for teachers.

=== Parent teacher organization ===
A parent teacher organization (PTO) is a formal organization that consists of parents, teachers, and school staff. The organization's goals may vary from organization to organization but the core goals include parent volunteerism, teacher and student encouragement, community involvement, and student and family welfare. It is not affiliated with the national Parent-Teacher Association (PTA) or Parent-Teacher-Student Association (PTSA). The PTA is a national association of millions of members and thousands of local units that provides leadership training and staff support.

==== Goals and/or mission statement ====
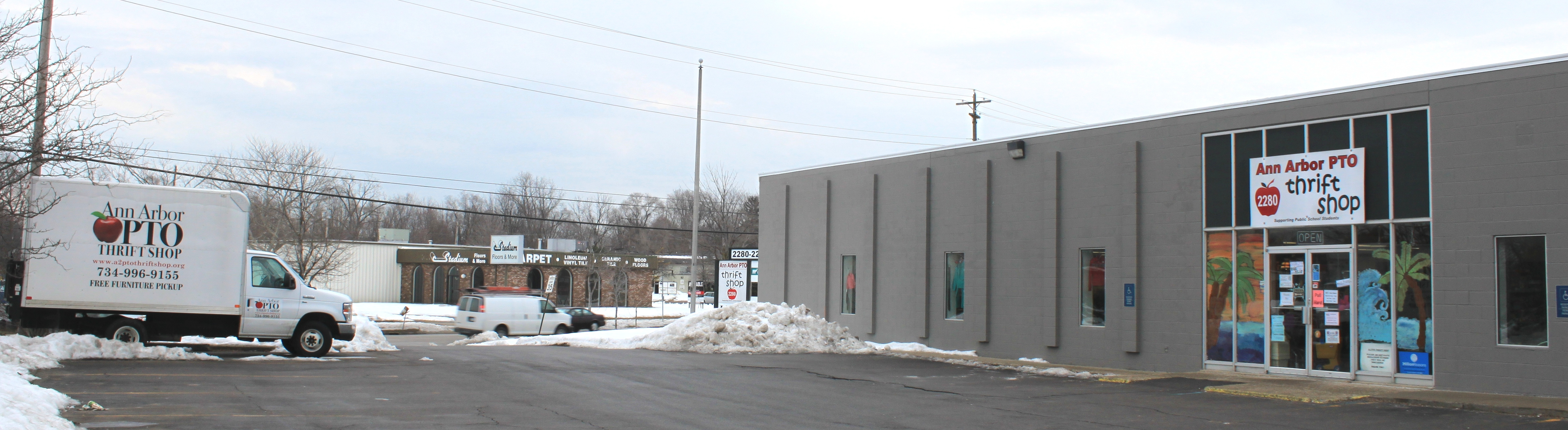
PTO Thrift Shop, Ann Arbor, Michigan

Individual organizations typically establish goals and/or a mission statement. Here is a sample PTO Mission Statement from the New Franklin School PTO:

The New Franklin School PTO is a nonprofit parent/teacher organization whose membership includes all parents, legal guardians and staff at New Franklin Elementary School.

The PTO's mission is to promote open communication and understanding between parents and staff of the New Franklin Elementary School. Our efforts serve to enhance and maximize the education of every child while aiding them in achieving their highest potential.

The PTO sponsors assistance to teachers in classroom setting, holds fund-raisers for supplemental educational materials and experiences, supports school and family social interaction, and provides a non-biased forum for sharing information on issues that impact our children.

It is our belief that the team effort of a parent teacher organization offers the best possible learning environment for our children.

==== for PTO board ====
A PTO generally consists of a board. These members may include a president, vice president, secretary and treasurer. They may also include various specialty positions, such as hospitality, or programs. The board typically governs the PTO by creating and voting on meeting dates, general meeting programs, etc.

==== PTO versus PTA ====
A PTO is not the same as a parent–teacher association (PTA). They are similar in that both promote parent participation, but the PTA takes a more active role in developing programs, advocacy, and training. PTA operates at the school building, district, state and national levels and works on policy to better support children. Local PTA units set their own goals and missions, but they also join together to advocate and partner as a larger group. PTA is membership based and uses money from dues to offer staff support and grants and to develop national programs, such as their Reflections arts in education program and their Standards for Family-School Partnerships implementation guide. A PTO is unaffiliated, local and does not pay dues to a national umbrella organization.

==== Activities ====
PTOs encourage parent, teacher, and community involvement by providing programs that facilitate various activities, including bicycle safety, drug awareness, energy conservation, reading programs, science programs, math programs, and pedestrian safety.

PTO parents get involved by supporting their students, teachers and staff. Parents can volunteer to be room parents to assist with class parties or field trips. They can help set up at a carnival or health fair. They can help teachers and staff by making copies for the class.

Teachers and staff may become involved by helping to plan events that encourage the education of the students. These may include workshops, tutoring or special family nights (math, science, reading).

The students reap the benefits by the involvement and support of all the adults involved in the PTO. The PTO supports the educational goals of the school, thus extending those goals to the students.

=== Notable members ===
- Kate M. Ainey, member
- C. Louise Boehringer, president Arizona chapter
- Leah Belle Kepner Boyce, corresponding secretary of the California Parent-Teacher Association
- Laura Chenoweth Butz, well known as lecturer
- Javiera Caballero, President of the PTA at Club Boulevard Magnet Elementary in Durham, North Carolina
- Saidie Orr Dunbar, Member
- Thora B. Gardiner, Member
- Cora Bussey Hillis, early member and president of the Iowa chapter
- Mary Hughes, Active
- Kate Wetzel Jameson, Member
- Nannie S. Brown Kramer, active in club and civic affairs and very much interested in P. T. A. work'; held several important offices in P. T. A. organizations, including vice-president, California Congress of P. T. A. and chairman of several committees, serving her second term as a member of the Oakland Board of Education
- Laura Adrienne MacDonald, president of Tonopah Parent-Teacher Association
- Jane Brunson Marks, served on board of H. S. Parent-Teacher Association for several years
- Sara E. Morse, Member
- Vesta C. Muehleisen, held several executive offices in the Congress of PTA and taught a Summer Session Course on the P.T. movement in the San Diego State College
- Mary Elizabeth Parsons, gave programs of own music and talks
- Beatrice A. Pedersen, secretary of Parent-Teacher Association
- Ada E. Purpus, President of the Parent-Teacher Association at the John Muir Junior High School
- Violet Richardson Ward, president of the local chapter
- Miriam Van Waters, active

== See also ==
- Parents and citizens (Australia)
- National Policy on Education, 1986
- Sarva Shiksha Abhiyan
- Rashtriya Madhyamik Shiksha Abhiyan
