= Nellie A. White =

American clubwoman

- Born: Chatham, Ohio, U.S.
- Died: September 16, 1952
- Occupations: Civic leader, club president
- Organization(s): Order of the Eastern Star, Woman's Club of Arcadia, Literary Club of Lodi
- Known for: Founder of "The Chrysanthemum Fete", Organizer of Greater Arcadia Beautification Committee
- Spouse: Fred H. White
- Children: Clayton E. White
- Parent(s): Alvin J. Dyer, Julia M. Dyer

Nellie A. White (died September 16, 1952) was the founder of "The Chrysanthemum Fete" flower show, the originator of the peach tree theme used by the annual Peach Blossom Festival and the organizer of the Greater Arcadia Beautification Committee.

== Early life ==
Nellie A. White was born in Chatham, Ohio, the daughter of Alvin J. and Julia M. Dyer.

== Career ==
Nellie A. White was active in club and civic affairs.

She was a Deputy Grand Matron of the Order of the Eastern Star of Ohio.

She was the president of the Woman's Club of Arcadia. While holding this office she planned and carried out the idea of a Flower Show which was established as an annual affair to be known as "The Chrysanthemum Fete." She is credited with originating the peach tree theme used by the annual Peach Blossom Festival in Arcadia.

She was a member of the Literary Club of Lodi.

In 1936 she organized the Greater Arcadia Beautification Committee of which she was elected chairman. The purpose of the committee was to make Arcardia a true Mecca for tourists with a Spring Festival of Blossoms attracting tourists every year.

== Personal life ==
Nellie A. White moved to California in 1921 and lived at 437 Duarte Road, Arcadia, California. She married Fred H. White and had one son, Clayton E. White.

She died on September 16, 1952.
