= National Education Association =

US teachers' trade union

- Abbreviation: NEA
- Founded: 1857; 169 years ago
- Type: 501(c)(5)
- Tax ID no.: 53-0115260
- Headquarters: Washington, D.C., U.S.
- Location: United States
- Members: 2,839,808 (2024)
- Key people: Princess R. Moss, president
- Affiliations: Education International
- Website: nea.org

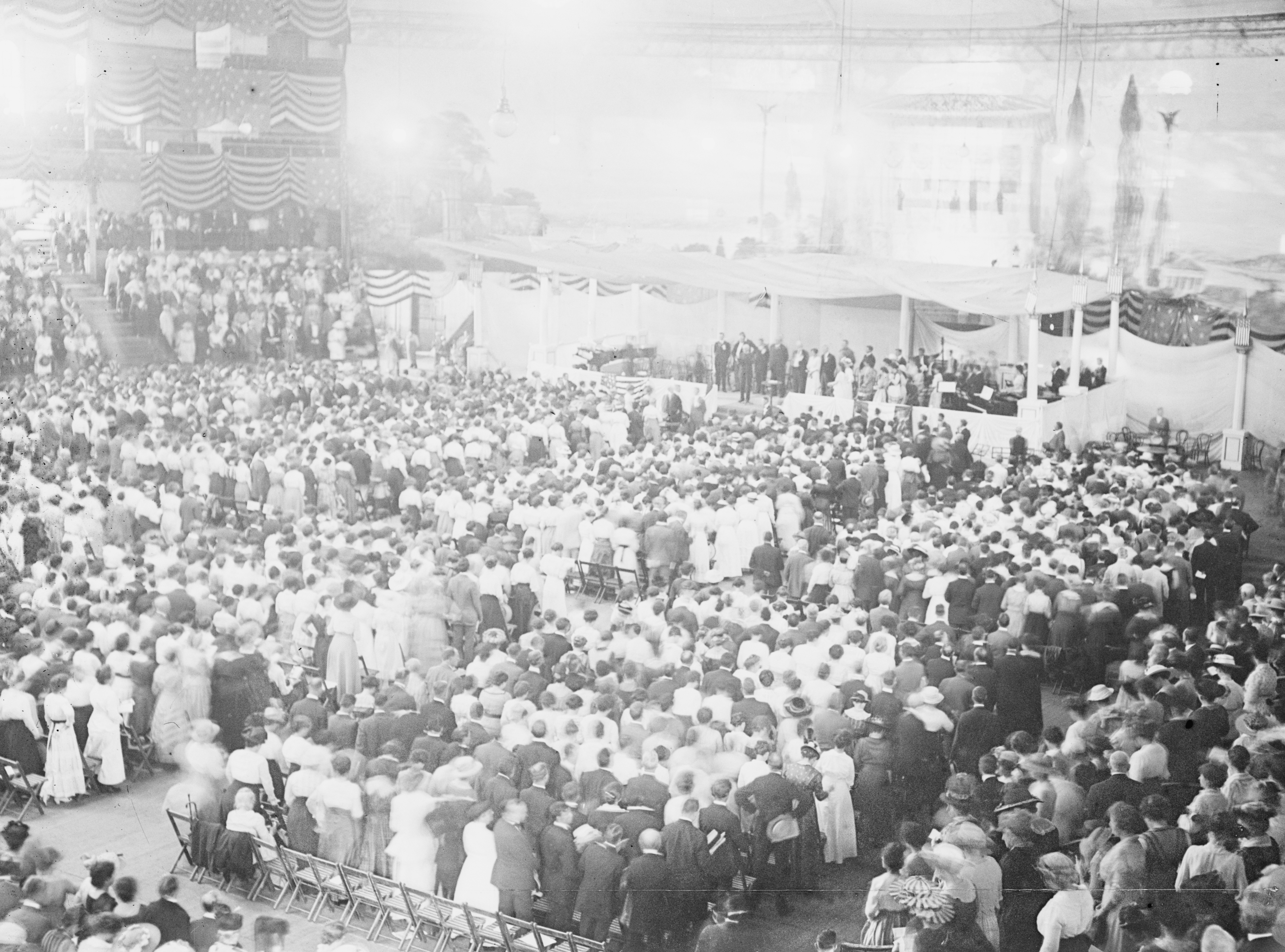
General meeting, National Education Association on July 3, 1916, at Madison Square Garden, New York City

The National Education Association (NEA) is the largest labor union in the United States. It represents public school teachers and other support personnel, faculty and staffers at colleges and universities, retired educators, and college students preparing to become teachers. The NEA has 2.8 million members and is headquartered in Washington, D.C. The NEA had a budget of $399 million in 2023 along with an endowment of $428 million.

During the early 20th century, the National Education Association was among the leading progressive advocates of establishing a United States Department of Education.

Driven by pressure from teacher organizing, by the 1970s the NEA transformed from an education advocacy organization to a rank-and-file union. In the decades since, the association has continued to represent organized teachers and other school workers in collective bargaining and to lobby for progressive education policy. The NEA's political agenda frequently brings it into conflict with conservative interest groups. State affiliates of the NEA regularly lobby state legislators for funding, seek to influence education policy, and file legal actions.

At the national level, the NEA lobbies the United States Congress and federal agencies and is active in the nominating process for Democratic candidates. The NEA is a major supporter of the Democratic Party.

== History ==
=== Founding ===
The NEA was founded in Philadelphia in 1857 as the National Teachers Association (NTA). Zalmon Richards was elected the NTA's first president and presided over the organization's first annual meeting in 1858. At the beginning and for its first century of history, it had the character of a professional association rather than a labor union. The NTA became the National Educational Association (NEA) in 1870 when it merged with the American Normal School Association, the National Association of School Superintendents, and the Central College Association. The union was chartered by Congress in 1906.

The NEA was generally opposed to the New Deal. Its main goal was for Congress to pass a multipurpose public finance bill that would supplement local property taxes in funding public schools. Some relief money was used to build schools, but the New Deal avoided channeling any of it through the Office of Education. Legislation never succeeded, because it would condone segregated schools in the South and because President Franklin D. Roosevelt rejected any across-the-board program. He believed that federal money should only go to the poorest schools, and none to rich states. The New Deal set up its own separate educational program through the Civilian Conservation Corps and other relief agencies.

=== From association to labor union ===
For most of the 20th century, the NEA was dominated by the public school administration in small towns and rural areas. The state organizations played a major role in policy formation for the NEA. Only a small portion of American public school teachers were unionized before the 1960s. That began to change in 1959, when Wisconsin became the first state to pass a collective bargaining law for public employees. Over the next 20 years, most other states adopted similar laws.

The NEA merged with the American Teachers Association, the historically Black teachers association founded as the National Association of Teachers in Colored Schools, in 1966. The NEA's merger with the ATA, its transformation into a true labor union, and other factors were to greatly change the organization's demographics. In 1967, the NEA elected its first Hispanic president, Braulio Alonso. In 1968, NEA elected its first black president, Elizabeth Duncan Koontz.

After 1957, the NEA began a process that would transform it into an organization representing the teachers in its districts, rather than just the administrators. It came to resemble the rival American Federation of Teachers (AFT), which was a labor union for teachers in larger cities. The success of the AFT in raising wages through strike activity encouraged the NEA to undertake similar activities. The years between 1957 and 1973 saw a gradual shift in power to the association's classroom teachers, a tentative embrace of collective bargaining and teacher strikes, and the creation of a political action committee. These changes culminated in a new constitution adopted in 1973. The constitution expelled school administrators entirely and made structural changes to allow the NEA to operate as a labor union. As a compromise with members still skeptical of unionization, the NEA did not join the AFL-CIO, the United States' main trade union federation.

In the 1970s, more militant politics came to characterize the NEA. Its political action committee engaged in local election campaigns, and the union began endorsing political candidates who supported its policy goals. State NEA branches became less important as the national and local levels began direct and unmediated relationships. The NEA's elected leadership often supported teachers in opposition to school administrators.

=== Relations with the American Federation of Teachers ===
In 1998, a tentative merger agreement was reached between NEA and American Federation of Teachers (AFT) negotiators, but ratification failed soundly in the NEA's Representative Assembly meeting in New Orleans in early July 1998. However, six NEA state affiliates have since merged with their AFT counterparts. Mergers occurred in Florida (the Florida Education Association formed in 2000); Minnesota (Education Minnesota formed in 1998), Montana (MEA-MFT formed in 2000), New York (New York State United Teachers formed in 2006), North Dakota (North Dakota United formed in 2013), and West Virginia (Education West Virginia formed in 2025).

In 2006, the NEA and the AFL–CIO also announced that, for the first time, stand-alone NEA locals as well as those that had merged with the AFT would be allowed to join state and local labor federations affiliated with the AFL-CIO.

=== 2024 NEASO lockout ===
The National Education Association Staff Organization (NEASO) is the staff union representing employees who work for the NEA. In July 2024, NEASO staff members went on a three-day strike protesting what it charged were NEA's unfair labor practices. This resulted in the halting of the National Education Association's (NEA) annual representative assembly in Philadelphia. The event, which was scheduled to run for four days over the Fourth of July weekend, brings together thousands of educators to vote on the union's priorities, budget, and strategic plan. President Joe Biden, who was expected to address the delegates, canceled his appearance, citing his refusal to cross the picket line.

Following the strike, the NEA locked out nearly 300 staff members working at its headquarters in Washington, D.C. These staff members were not paid or allowed to work until August 15, 2024, when NEA and NEASO reached agreement on a new contract.

== Composition ==
According to NEA's Department of Labor records since 2005, when membership classifications were first reported, the majority of the union's membership are "active professional" members, having fallen only slightly from 74% to the current 71%. The second largest category have been "active education support professional" members, with about 15%. The third largest category are "retired" members, which have grown from 8% to 10%. Two other categories, "active life" and "student" members, have both remained with around 2%, falling slightly. These categories are eligible to vote in the union, though the union lists some comparatively marginal categories which are not eligible to vote: "staff", "substitute" and "reserve" members, each with less than 1% of the union's membership. NEA contracts also cover some non-members, known as agency fee payers, which since 2006 have numbered comparatively about 3% of the size of the union's membership.

As of 2014 these categories account for about: 2.1 million "active professionals", 457,000 "active education support professionals", 300,000 "retirees", 52,000 "students", 42,000 "active life" members, and just under nine thousand others, plus about 90,000 non-members paying agency fees.

=== Membership trends ===
Membership (US records; ×1000)
View source data.
Finances (US records; ×$1000)
View source data.

The NEA reported a membership of 766,000 in 1961. In 2007, at the 150th anniversary of its founding, NEA membership had grown to 3.2 million. However, by July 2012, USA Today reported that NEA had lost nearly 0.3% of their members each year since 2010.

Following the Supreme Court's 2018 Janus v. AFSCME case, which ended the compulsion of non-union, public employees to pay agency fees, or what are colloquially known as 'fair-share fees,' the NEA's total membership and agency fee payers dropped from 3,074,841 on its November 28, 2017, report to 2,975,933 in its August 31, 2019, report, a total loss of 98,908 dues payers.

== Structure and governance ==
The NEA has a membership of approximately 2.8 million, making it the largest labor union in the United States. The majority of NEA's affiliates are recognized as trade unions, but depending on state law, they may be limited to a professional association. The group holds a congressional charter under Title 36 of the United States Code. NEA is a member of Education International, the global federation of teachers' unions.

Leadership and governance

The Representative Assembly, or RA, is the supreme decision-making body of the NEA, and the largest democratic deliberative body in the world. Over 6,000 elected delegates representing states, locals, and various membership groups convene each summer to deliberate and adopt the objectives, initiatives, and business that guides the Association. RA delegates also elect the union's executive officers and members of the Executive Committee, and adopt the Association’s nearly-$400 million annual budget.

The NEA Executive Committee has nine elected members: three officers and six at-large committee members. All Executive Committee positions are limited to two three-year terms. Princess Moss and Noel Candelaria were elected NEA President and Vice President, respectively, in July 2026 elections.

Kim A. Anderson is currently serving as the executive director, having been appointed in 2019. The executive director is a staff position and is not elected. The executive director oversees association staff and the implementation of business.

The board of directors and executive committee are responsible for the general policies and interests of the NEA. The board of directors consists of one director from each state affiliate (plus an additional director for every 20,000 active members in the state), at-large directors for retired members, aspiring educators, higher education, and education support professionals. The board also includes representatives from ethnic minority affairs caucuses, school nurses, and administrators. The executive committee consists of the president, vice president, and secretary-treasurer plus six members elected at large by delegates to the Representative Assembly. It acts for the board of directors when it is not in session.

== Funding ==
Most NEA funding comes from dues paid by its members ($295 million in dues from a $341 million total budget in 2005). Typically, local chapters negotiate a contract with automatic deduction of dues from members' paychecks. Part of the dues remain with the local affiliate (the district association), a portion goes to the state association, and a portion is given to the national association. The NEA returned 39 percent of dues money back to state affiliates in 2021 and 2022.

Federal law prohibits unions from using dues money or other assets to contribute to or otherwise assist federal candidates or political parties, in accordance with their tax-exempt status. The NEA Fund for Children and Public Education is a special fund for voluntary contributions from NEA members which can legally be used to assist candidates and political parties. Critics have repeatedly questioned the NEA's actual compliance with such laws, and a number of legal actions focusing on the union's use of money and union personnel in partisan contexts have ensued.

== Read Across America Day ==
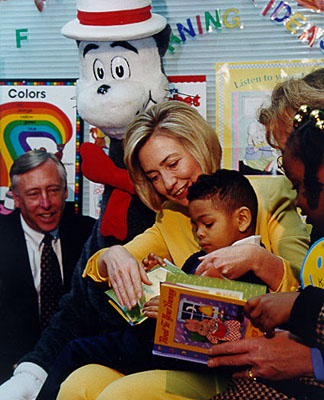
Hillary Clinton participates in Read Across America Day in Maryland, 1998.

National Read Across America Day is an NEA initiative to encourage reading. It has expanded into a year-long program with special celebrations in March as National Reading Month. Read Across America Day began in 1998, on March 2 which was the birthday of the popular children's author, Dr. Seuss. The NEA partnered with Dr. Seuss Enterprises on the venture from 1997 to 2018, when the contract ended. Since 2017, NEA's Read Across America focuses on the importance, value, and fun of reading and sharing diverse books and "celebrating a nation of diverse readers".

== Political activities ==
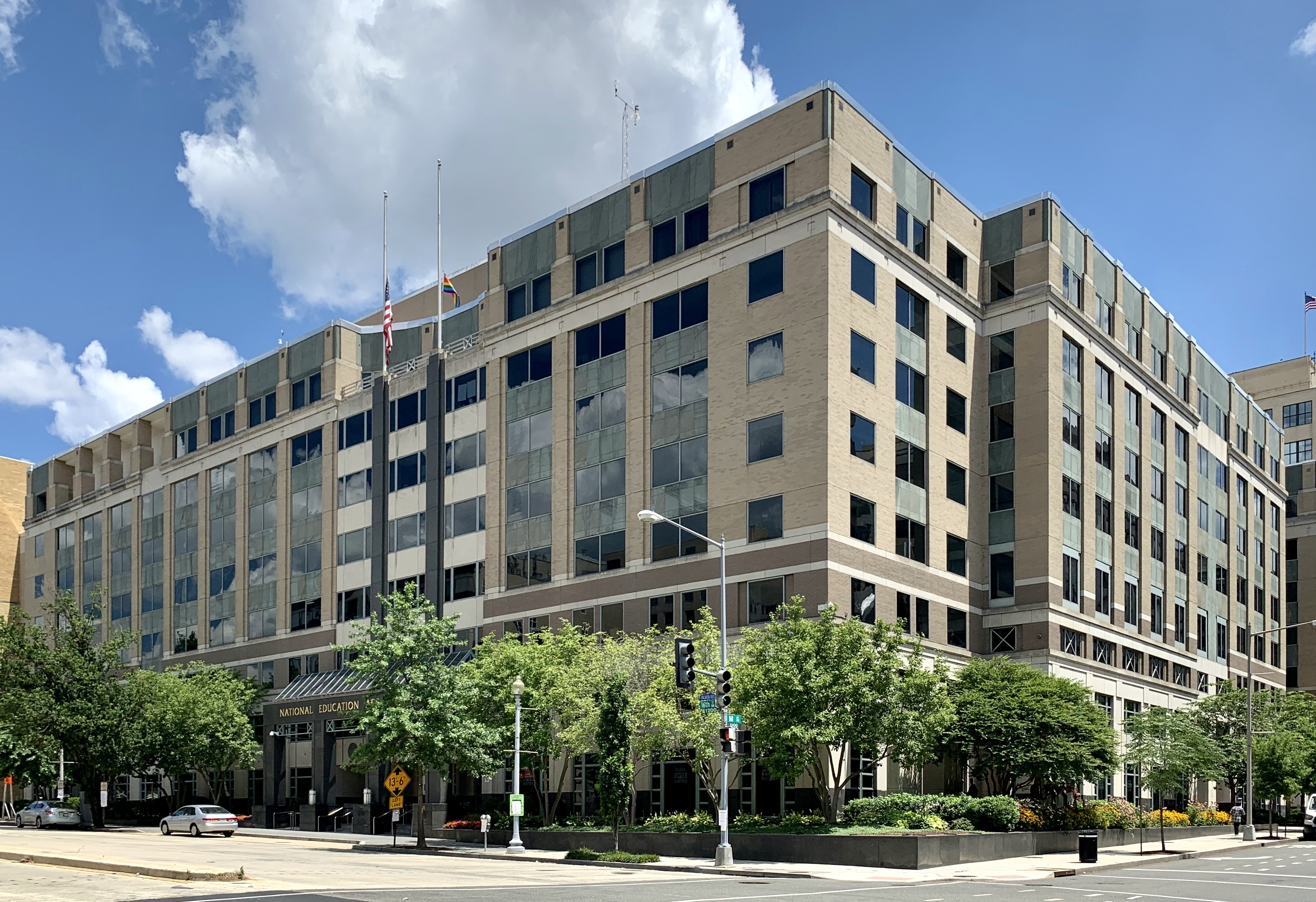
The National Education Association headquarters located at 1201 16th Street near the White House

NEA has played a role in politics since its founding, as it has sought to influence state and federal laws that would affect public education. The extent to which the NEA and its state and local affiliates engage in political activities, especially during election cycles, has been a source of controversy. The organization tracks legislation related to education and the teaching profession and encourages members to get involved in politics.

- 1910–1915: Women played increasing leadership roles in NEA.
- 1912: The NEA endorsed women's suffrage in the United States
- 1918: The report "Cardinal Principles of Secondary Education" emphasized the education of students in terms of health, a command of fundamental processes, worthy home membership, vocation, citizenship, worthy use of leisure, and ethical character. They emphasized life adjustment and reflected the social efficiency model of progressive education.
- 1918: The NEA Commission on the Emergency in Education, with George Strayer as chairman, warned that the evidence from the wartime draft showed millions of potential soldiers were illiterate or poorly educated, and often in bad health. The NEA study said the cause was very low quality rural schools in the South, badly trained teachers, and inequitable financing. It called for $100 million of federal aid to remedy the deficiencies, but none was forthcoming. Many states, however, started setting minimal standards for rural schools.
- 1920: The "Preliminary Report on the Tenure of Teachers" cautiously recommended that school boards adopt a policy of academic tenure.
- 1923: The NEA began to promote state pension plans for teachers; by 1950, every state had a pension plan in effect.
- 1923–1928: Hunter's "Committee of One Hundred on the Problem of Tenure" stressed the advantages of tenure for society. In 1925, it argued that tenure "protects the great body of good teachers from political attack and from dismissal for petty personal and political reasons", but also argued that administrators should maintain control over dismissal decisions.
- 1920s: The main NEA goals during this period were to raise teacher salaries, raise standards, and to gain a cabinet-level U.S. Secretary of Education. Success on the cabinet issue came only in 1979.
- 1930s: The NEA lobbied, mostly unsuccessfully, for Congress to pass a multipurpose public finance bill that would supplement local property taxes in funding public schools. Some relief money was used to build schools, but the New Deal avoided channeling any of it through the Office of Education. Legislation never succeeded, because it would condone segregated schools in the South and because Roosevelt rejected any across-the-board program. He believed that federal money should only go to the poorest schools, and none to rich states. The New Deal set up its own separate educational program through the Civilian Conservation Corps and other relief agencies.
- 1940s: The NEA successfully lobbied Congress for special funding for public schools near military bases.
- 1944: The NEA lobbied for the G.I. Bill, a law that provided a range of benefits for returning World War II veterans.
- 1958: The NEA helped gain passage of the National Defense Education Act.
- 1964: The NEA lobbied to pass the Civil Rights Act
- 1965: The NEA worked with Catholic school leaders to pass the Elementary and Secondary Education Act for federal aid to schools.
- 1968: After years of feuding, the AFT suggested a merger with the NEA. The NEA refuses.
- 1968: The NEA lobbied for passage of the Bilingual Education Act, with federal funding for Spanish-language education in public schools.
- 1968-68: There was a wave of school strikes outside South, 80% by the NEA.
- 1969: 450,000 teachers were covered by 1,019 collective bargaining agreements. The NEA accounted for 90 percent of the contracts and 61 percent of the teachers.
- 1972: The New York State Teachers Association quit the NEA and merged with the AFT.
- 1970s: State affiliates become powerful lobbyists.
- 1976: 265 NEA delegates attended the Democratic National Convention; the NEA endorsed Democrat Jimmy Carter for president. He won and secured the creation of the Department of Education in 1979.
- 1980: 464 NEA delegates attended the Democratic National Convention.
- 1984: The NEA lobbied for passage of a federal retirement equity law to provide the means to end sex discrimination against women in retirement funds.
- 2000: The NEA began to lobby for changes to the No Child Left Behind Act.
- 2009: NEA delegates to the Representative Assembly passed a resolution opposing discriminatory treatment of same-sex couples.
- 2013: the NEA wrote an open letter to the United States House of Representatives opposing the Continuing Appropriations Resolution, 2014 (H.J.Res 59; 113th Congress). The NEA urged representatives to vote no because the bill "continues the devastating cuts to education set in motion by the sequester and permanently defunds the Affordable Care Act."
- 2020: Together with the American Federation of Teachers, NEA issued a report expressing opposition to active shooter drills being held in schools, calling on the drills to be revised or eliminated.

=== Other policy positions ===
The NEA has taken positions on policy issues including:

- Reforming the No Child Left Behind Act to reduce the focus on standardized testing
- Increasing education funding
- A minimum $40,000 starting annual salary for all teachers
- Mandate high school graduation or equivalency as compulsory for everyone below the age of 21
- Lowering the achievement gap
- Reforming Social Security Offsets (GPO/WEP)
- Discouraging school vouchers and all forms of competition with public schools
- Reforming laws governing charter schools

The NEA is a member of the U.S. Global Leadership Coalition.

=== Electoral politics ===
In recent decades the NEA has increased its visibility in party politics, contributing funds and other assistance to political campaigns. Like other American labor unions, the NEA has favored the Democratic Party, giving its endorsement and support to every Democratic nominee for President since Jimmy Carter. It has never endorsed any Republican or third party candidate for the presidency.

Based on required filings with the federal government, it is estimated that between 1990 and 2002, eighty percent of the NEA's substantial political contributions went to Democratic Party candidates. Ninety-five percent of contributions went to Democrats in 2012. the NEA maintains that it bases support for candidates primarily on the organization's interpretation of candidates' support for public education and educators. Every presidential candidate endorsed by the NEA must be recommended by the NEA's PAC Council (composed of representatives from every state and caucus) and approved by the Board of Directors by a 58 percent majority. In October 2015, the NEA endorsed Hillary Clinton's 2016 presidential bid. Clinton accepted the endorsement in person.

== Criticism ==
Some critics have alleged that the NEA puts the interests of teachers ahead of students. The NEA has often opposed measures such as merit pay, school vouchers, weakening of teacher tenure, certain curricular changes, the No Child Left Behind Act, and other reforms that make it easier for school districts to use disciplinary action against teachers. In July 2019, the NEA voted down a resolution that would have "re-dedicate[d] itself to the pursuit of increased student learning in every public school in America by putting a renewed emphasis on quality education".

With the modern scrutiny placed on teacher misconduct, particularly regarding sexual abuse, the NEA has been criticized for its alleged failure to crack down on abusive teachers. From an Associated Press investigation, former NEA President Reg Weaver commented, "Students must be protected from sexual predators and abuse, and teachers must be protected from false accusations". He then refused to be interviewed. The Associated Press reported that much of the resistance to report the problem comes from "where fellow teachers look away", and "school administrators make behind-the-scenes deals".

Inclusion of the "NEA Ex-Gay Caucus" at a convention in 2006 sparked controversy. Some critics believe the NEA promotes a "gay rights agenda", especially since the United States Court of Appeals for the Ninth Circuit's 2005 case Fields v. Palmdale School District. The case originated when some California elementary school students were administered a school survey containing sexual questions. Parents, who had not been told the survey would include questions about sexuality, brought the case forward. The court in that case initially ruled that parents' fundamental right to control the upbringing of their children "does not extend beyond the threshold of the school door", which upon petition for rehearing was struck and clarified to "does not entitle individual parents to enjoin school boards from providing information the boards determine to be appropriate in connection with the performance of their educational functions", and that a public school has the right to provide its students with "whatever information it wishes to provide, sexual or otherwise". NEA states that it does not "encourage schools to teach students to become gay, lesbian, bisexual, or transgendered (LGBT)", but the NEA does believe that "schools should be safe for all students and advocates that schools should raise awareness of homophobia and intervene when LGBT students are harassed".

A leading critic of NEA from the left is Rich Gibson, whose 1998 article on the NEA–AFT merger convention outlined a critique of unionism itself.

== Notable members ==
- Zalmon Richards, founder and president
- Cornelia Storrs Adair, first teacher to serve as president of the National Education Association
- C. Louise Boehringer, in 1913 she spoke at their convention in San Francisco
- Jill Biden, First Lady of the United States from 2021-2025
- Della Prell Darknell Campbell
- William George Carr, Executive Director of the NEA from 1952 to 1967
- Katherine M. Cook (1876–1962), Chief, Division of Rural Education, Bureau of Education; Chief, Division of Special Problems, Office of Education, HEW
- Sabra R. Greenhalgh, life member of the NEA, elected a delegate to represent northern California at the annual convention in Columbus, Ohio, in 1931
- Jessie Gray (educator), president (1933–1934)
- Ada Van Stone Harris (1866-1923), President, NEA's Department of Elementary Education (1916)
- Kate Wetzel Jameson, member
- Samuel M. Lambert, executive secretary of the NEA from 1967 to 1972
- Vesta C. Muehleisen, member
- Caroline Haven Ober, member
- William F. Phelps, founder and president
- Waurine Walker, president (1954–1955)
- Pearl Anderson Wanamaker, president (1946–1947)
- Caroline S. Woodruff, president (1937–1938)
- Mary Yost, vice-president of the Western Division of Department of Deans of Women

== See also ==
- 1990 West Virginia teachers' strike
