= Rebecca B. Mellors =

American educator

Rebecca B. Mellors (November 7, 1899 - 1989) was an educator.

== Early life ==
Rebecca B. Mellors was born in Weir, Kansas, on November 7, 1899, the daughter of Thomas Mellors and Annie Willey.

== Career ==
Rebecca B. Mellors was an educator. In 1927 she was named clerk and first secretary of the School District No. 49, Metford. In 1928 the Medford Mail Tribune wrote that 80% of those who directed the destiny of the young people of Medford were women and that ranking high in the positions of responsibility was Mellors. Always in 1928, the Census showed that Medford school system ranked 4th in size in the state of Oregon and that Mellors was in the School board.

Later she became clerk of the Medford, Jackson County, Board of Education.

She was a member of Order of the Eastern Star and Business and Professional Women's Club. In 1929 she was appointed chairmen of Education of the Business and Professional Women's club.

== Personal life ==
She lived in Kansas and Idaho. While in Kansas she was living with Lila Veatch. In 1920 she moved to Jerome, Arizona, and later to Medford, Oregon.

Her married name was Jensen. She died in 1989 and is buried at Siskiyou Memorial Park, Medford.
