= Ella A. Bigelow =

American author and historian

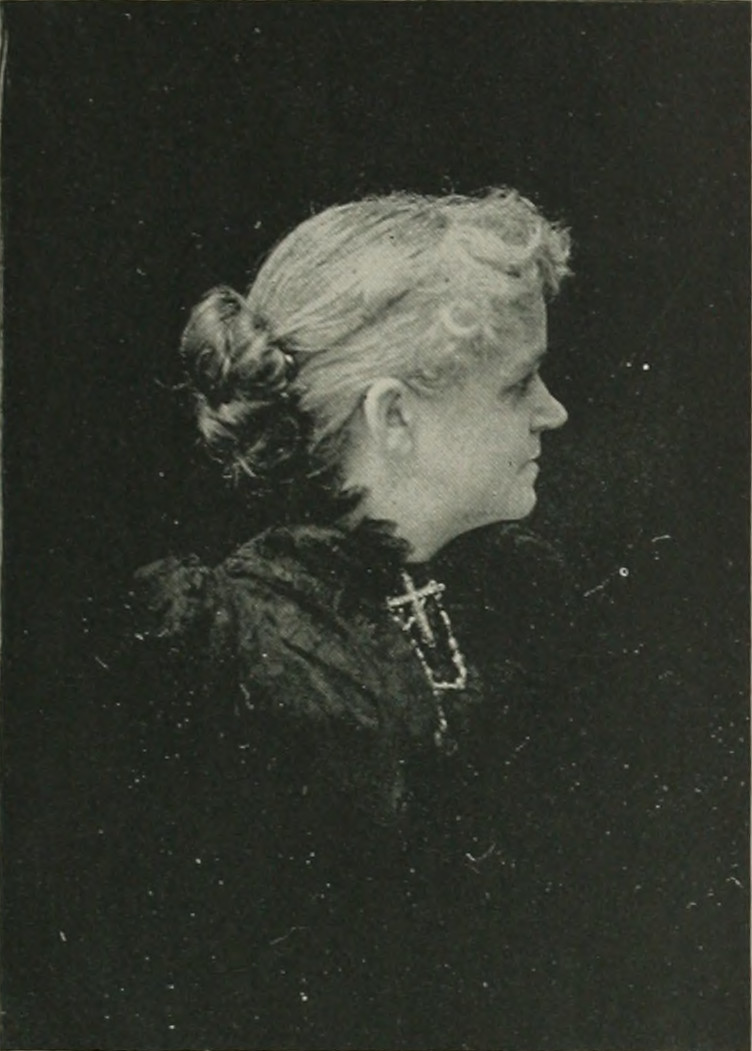
- "A Woman of the Century"
- Born: Ella Augusta Fisher; May 21, 1849; Malden, Massachusetts, U.S.
- Died: October 23, 1917 (aged 68); Marlborough, Massachusetts, U.S.
- Occupations: author; historian; clubwoman
- Spouse: Edward Lambert Bigelow (m. 1877; died 1915)
- Writing career
- Language: English
- Notable works: Historical Reminiscences of the Early Times in Marlborough, Massachusetts

Ella A. Bigelow (May 21, 1849 – October 23, 1917) was an American author, historian, and clubwoman. Among her publications were Prize Quotations (Marlboro, 1887), Venice (Marlboro, 1890), Old Masters of Art (Buffalo, 1888), and Letters upon Greece (Marlboro, 1891). Containing 124 watercolors commissioned by Bigelow, her Historical Reminiscences of the Early Times in Marlborough, Massachusetts (1910), is described in The Boston Globe (1999) as "the best source we have for Marlborough history before 1910".

== Early life and education ==
Ella Augusta Fisher was born in Malden, Massachusetts, May 21, 1849. Her father, Lewis Fisher, and mother, Ruth Benchley, were both of English descent. For many years, her home was in the town of Milford, Massachusetts.

Her parents being in financially good circumstances, she received a good education. Developing a taste for music, she was placed with teachers in Boston. As a church singer, she was well known in Fitchburg, Massachusetts and various other cities, singing at intervals with such artists as Carlyle Petersilea and Julius Eichberg with his "Germania Orchestra." In 1873, she went to Germany, residing chiefly in Berlin. There she studied with Ferdinand Sieber, court professor of music, and Fraulein Kess, both of whom gave her strong encouragement to choose a musical career.

== Career ==
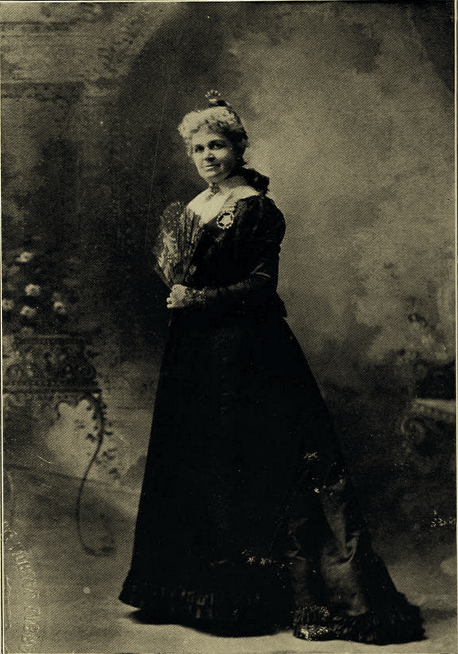
(1910)

Becoming acquainted with Mr. and Mrs. George Bancroft, U.S. Ambassador to Germany at that time, the opportunity was given to her meeting many celebrities and scholars of the era. Before returning to the U.S., she traveled through Europe.

Bigelow published Prize Quotations (Marlboro, 1887), Venice (Marlboro, 1890), Old Masters of Art (Buffalo, 1888), Letters upon Greece (Marlboro, 1891), Entertaining and instructive prize game; one hundred and fifty questions on the old masters (Buffalo, 1889), and Historical Reminiscences of the Early Times in Marlborough, Massachusetts (1910). She served as editor of Mizpah, the organ of the Order of the Eastern Star.

For years, she contributed articles to various papers.

Bigelow served as president of numerous literary and musical clubs. She was also a member of the Daughters of the American Revolution.

== Personal life ==
On January 10, 1877, at Milford, she married Edward Lambert Bigelow ((1839–1915)), of Marlboro, Massachusetts and thereafter resided in an old Colonial house, full of antiques and souvenirs of travel.

Ella Augusta Fisher Bigelow died in Marlborough, Massachusetts, October 23, 1917.

== Selected works ==
Historical Reminiscences of the Early Times in Marlborough, Massachusetts

- Prize Quotations (1887)
- Old Masters of Art (1888)
- Venice (1890)
- Letters upon Greece (1891)
- Historical Reminiscences of the Early Times in Marlborough, Massachusetts (1910) (Text)
