= Aletha Gilbert =

American civic leader and policewoman

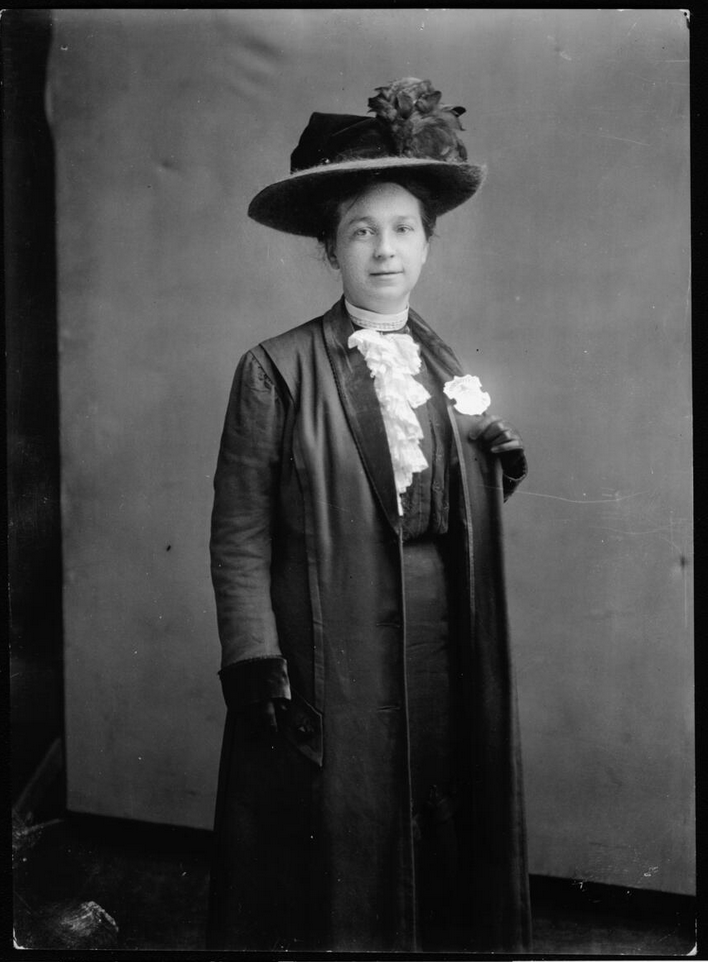
- Gilbert in 1910
- Born: Aletha T. Maxey; January 17, 1870; El Monte, California, U.S.
- Died: June 3, 1931 (aged 61); Los Angeles, California, U.S.
- Occupations: Civic leader; police matron/officer; clubwoman
- Known for: Founder, City Mother's Bureau of Los Angeles

Aletha Gilbert (1870–1931) was an American civic leader who worked as a police matron and policewoman, being one of the first policewomen hired in Los Angeles. She was a pioneer in the more humanitarian treatment of prisoners, both with regard to sanitary conditions and educational occupation while incarcerated. Gilbert was the founder of the Los Angeles's City Mother's Bureau and served as the city's first City Mother. This Bureau was recognized by Scotland Yard as the first crime prevention bureau to be established in any police department in the world. Gilbert was also an active clubwoman.

== Early life and education ==
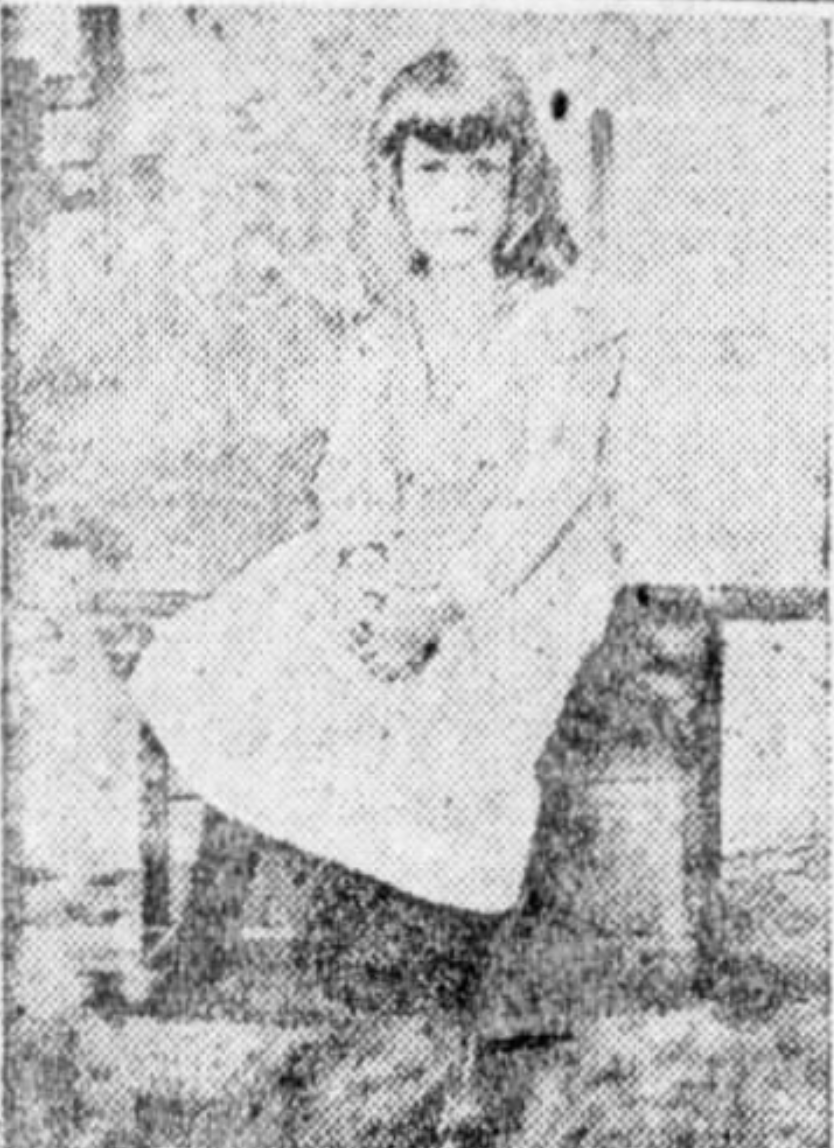
Gilbert, age 5

Aletha T. Maxey was born in El Monte, California, January 17, 1870, of pioneer parents, Warren Woodson Maxey and Lucy Utheria Thompson. Mr. Maxey came out to California in 1851. The father raised stock and was the pioneer to open up Lytle Creek, California, where he took a government claim and developed a ranch which afterward sold for a large sum. He began there with a log hut, and the bears frequently came about the hut. It was the section near San Bernardino later called Glen Ranch. Mrs. Gilbert's mother, Lucy Thompson, was nine years old when she first came to El Monte. She came to California from Iowa by ox team. The party was snowed in in the mountains, went without food except for crow meat and what game could be secured, and for another period they were without water. Danger and hardship also came to them from the Native Americans. They stopped at Tucson, where a band of Native Americans surrounded them and were going to take away their food and blankets. Lucy Thompson, just as the Native Americans were drawing their bows and arrows, jumped up and took a piece of fire to light the pipes of the Indians, who praised her for her bravery, and that act warded off death from the party. When Lucy Thompson was sixteen years old, she eloped with Mr. Maxey. She became the mother of seven children. When Mr. Maxey died she took up a squatter's claim at Azusa, California and reared her family alone. When her children were old enough to be self-supporting, she married Thomas Gray. When she married him, Mr. Gray owned 320 acres (130 ha) in a nice part of Los Angeles, on the site of the present location of Harvard School. Two children were born to Mr. and Mrs. Gray. Lucy Thompson was the first jail matron of the Los Angeles Police Department.

Her life in the country developed in her tastes for all out of door sports, swimming, diving, horsemanship and other athletics. When a young girl she frequently would board the horse cars and the drivers would allow her to drive back and forth. Her brothers kept a wood and feed yard at Second and Spring streets, selling grain, wood and coal and taking care of the teams that came to town. Since childhood, Gilbert also interested herself in practical ways to help others.

Gilbert attended school at Azusa and Los Angeles.

== Career ==
Early in her career, Gilbert was engaged as a traveling salesperson.

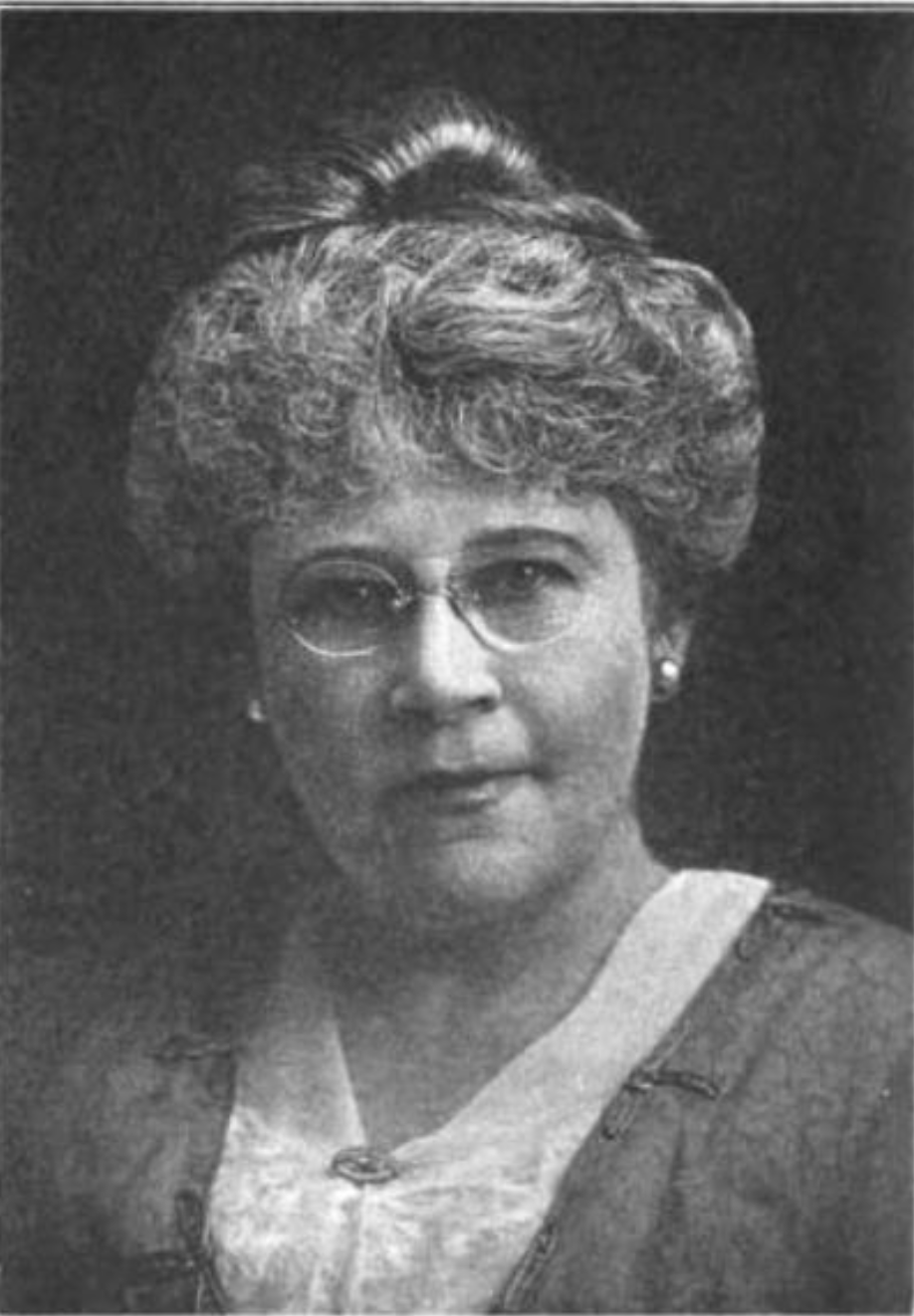
Gilbert in 1921

Gilbert was a resident of Los Angeles for 50 years. For years, Gilbert assisted her mother in a volunteer capacity at the Los Angeles Police Department. She began doing uplift work at the age of nineteen and worked on emergency call in the police department. Gilbert was employed by the department from 1902 to 1929, during which, from 1902 to 1914, she served as police matron and policewoman. She served in every branch of the Police Department, assisted in organizing a Police Juvenile Bureau after the Juvenile Court was established, and advocated and was largely responsible for a woman referee being appointed to Juvenile Court.

After twenty years experience with police and juvenile work, Gilbert had the idea of forming a City Mother's Bureau. She went to the chief of police of Los Angeles and presented a comprehensive plan for prevention of delinquency by providing for city mothers to assist wayward and unmoral boys and girls. Established September 1, 1914, its first location was a room in the Normal Hill center. With an advisory board of ten experienced women of the city, most of whom had experience in social service work, she began the introduction and framing of certain ordinances that would regulate the many risks potential to juveniles. The scope of their activities went far beyond the original limits. Domestic troubles of almost every nature were resolved. This board also helped in the creating of a fund through which girls and boys without parents might be given emergency help until work or a proper home could be found for them. The City Mother achieved good results. By 1921, only once in the hundreds of cases that they handled was it found necessary to resort to police powers. While the original object of the bureau was to prevent delinquency and protect dependents, the need for a general clearing house of kinds of problems was early manifest, and the City Mothers were equal to the task. The bulk of the work of the City Mothers, however, was to help young boys and girls, and young men and women to keep within the law. In thus preventing trouble and forestalling crime, they saved the city and county many thousands of dollars annually. By 1921, a legal adviser was appointed by the mayor. All the work was carried out without extra expense to the city. Gilbert retired in 1930.

Gilbert started Municipal dances, and was committee chair to draft a Dancing Academy Ordinance.

At the beginning of World War I, she established a Day Nursery for children of working mothers. She also created the first milk fund for undernourished children.

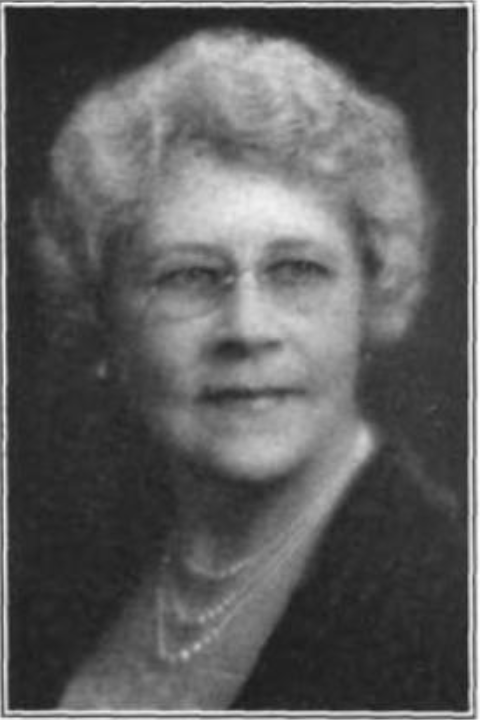
Gilbert in 1929

Gilbert was a charter member and chair of the Board of Directors, Soroptimist International Los Angeles. She was a member of Order of the Eastern Star, Woman's City Club, the Fraternal Brotherhood, and Native Daughters of the Golden West. She was the first honorary member to the Women's Breakfast Club.

== Personal life ==
In 1886,{{According to Who's Who in Los Angeles County (1929), the marriage occurred in 1887.}} she married T. M. Gilbert at Los Angeles, who was a stationary engineer and ran the first electric railway in Los Angeles. They had one daughter, Hilda.

Aletha Gilbert died in Los Angeles, on June 3, 1931, from injuries sustained in an automobile accident.

== Selected works ==
- "The Duties of a "City Mother", The American City Magazine, edited by Arthur Hastings Grant, Harold S. Buttenheim, New York, March 1922, Volume 26, No. 3, pp. 239–40
