= Bernice Cameron =

American telegraph company manager

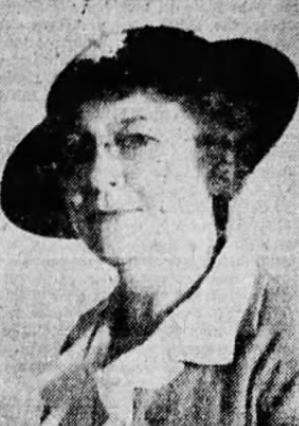
Bernice Cameron, 2 Jul 1939, Medford Mail Tribune

Laura Bernice Cameron (July 30, 1883 – January 19, 1959) was the manager of the Postal Telegraph-Cable Company of Medford, Oregon, and a World War I veteran.

== Early life ==
Laura Bernice Cameron was born in Jacksonville, Oregon, on July 30, 1883, the daughter of Robert J. and Esther L. Cameron. The family owned a ranch in the Applegate area.

In 1894 she enrolled in the Monmouth Normal School and in 1901 went to teacher's school in Ashland. After graduation became a teacher for a few years in the valley.

== Career ==
Bernice Cameron was the manager of the Postal Telegraph-Cable Company. When she became manager of the Medford Postal telegraph office in 1907 it was an unusual circumstance since very few women were appointed managers. She earned respect and admiration of the community through the successful management of the company. In 1923 she won the prize of the Postal Telegraph company for having the most successful office of its size on the West Coast. She retired in 1939 after 32 years of services.

In 1897 she was initiated to the Adarel Chapter of the Order of the Eastern Star and remained a member for 60 years. She was identified with the history of the chapter: her uncle, Todd Cameron, in 1880 presented the chapter with an organ that had been shipped to Crescent City by water and was carried over the mountain trails to Jacksonville; her mother, Esther Cameron, assisted in organizing the grand chapter of Oregon in 1899 in Roseburg.

She was a member of the Jacksonville County Republican Club, the Zonta Club, the St. Mark's Episcopal church and the Medford Post No. 15 of the American Legion, by reason of Yeomanette Service during World War I. She served in the Naval Intelligence as chief electrician at the Bremerton navy yard in Washington and was "chief of drafting". She remained a member of the American Legion for 40 years.

She was for many years a member of the Jackson County Chamber of Commerce.

== Personal life ==
Bernice Cameron lived at 112 Geneva St., Medford, Oregon.

In 1954 she inherited $20,000 ($179,503.35 in 2017) from her aunt, Mrs. William Hanley.

She died on January 19, 1959, and is buried in the Cameron family plot in Jacksonville Cemetery.
