= Sara E. Morse =

American school superintendent (1871–1933)

Sara Evans Morse (October 22, 1871 – January 10, 1933) was an American public official in Montana. Morse was the executive secretary of the Montana Tuberculosis Association for three terms.

== Early life ==
Morse was born on October 22, 1871, in West Liberty, Iowa, the daughter of William and Marianna Evans.

== Education ==
Morse attended Oberlin College, Ohio.

== Career ==
After graduation she taught in Billings High School and in September 1908 she was elected Yellowstone County Superintendent of Schools, a position she held for three terms.

In 1914 she was appointed executive secretary of the Montana Tuberculosis Association.

She held positions in several organizations.

She was the secretary of the Social Welfare Association.

She was a member of Daughters of the American Revolution, P.E.O. Sisterhood, Parent-Teacher Association, Order of the Eastern Star, Helena Auxiliary of American Legion, Helena Women's Club.

== Personal life ==
Morse moved to Montana in 1899 and lived at 423 Clark St., Helena, Montana. On October 10, 1899, she married William H. Morse and had one daughter, Virginia Morse Bearss.

She died on January 10, 1933, and is buried at Mountview Cemetery, Billings, Montana.
