= Lois Randolph =

American superintendent of education

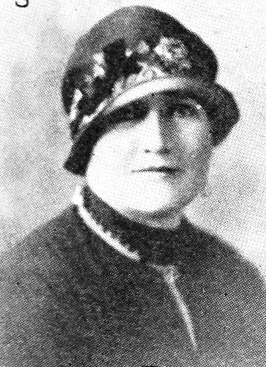
- Born: Washington
- Died: 16 October 1949; Albuquerque

Helen Lois Randolph (1889–1949) was the Superintendent of the New Mexico State Department of Education.

== Biography ==
Helen Lois Randolph was born in 1889 in Washington, Arkansas, the daughter of John Newton Randolph and Nancy Beane Vandever.

She was a former resident of Oklahoma, Arizona, and Arkansas, and moved to New Mexico in 1904 and lived at Santa Fe, New Mexico. In the 1940 census she was living at Cousins, McKinley, New Mexico.

From 1927 to 1928 she was Superintendent of Public Instruction. She was active in educational work; she had three years of experience in Government schools and four years in rural schools of New Mexico; she established the Opportunity School in Gallup, New Mexico; she was County Superintendent of McKinley County; since 1921 she served as State Chairman of Americanization under the New Mexico Federation of Women's Clubs; she organized the Southwestern Educational Association between the border states and the Republic of Mexico. She was one of three State Superintendents invited as guests of Dr. Hubert Work, Secretary of the Interior, to the educational conference in Honolulu in 1927. She was speaker for various State Teachers Associations: she was one of the nine state superintendents appointed to serve on the committee in charge of the national oratorical contest on Outlaw-War Treaties. She contributes to educational magazines.

In 1927 Randolph, as Superintendent of Public Instruction, informed Adelina Otero-Warren that she was in violation of the New Mexico School Code being involved with the Houghton Mifflin Company. As a consequence, Otero-Warren retired from the public office.

In 1946 she was named president of New Mexico Women's Republican Party.

She was a member of: Order of the Eastern Star, New Mexico Federation of Women's Clubs.

She died in 1949 and is buried at Sunset Memorial Park, Albuquerque.
