= Harriet A. Haas =

American attorney

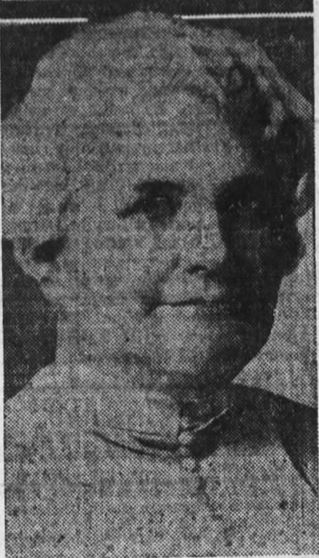
Harriet A. Haas

Harriet T. Averill Haas (October 17, 1874 in Virginia City, Nevada – January 20, 1958 in Albuquerque, New Mexico) was an American attorney and member of Piedmont Board of Education in the city of Piedmont, California. She was one of the most highly regarded members of the Alameda County, California bar.

== Early life ==
Harriet Averill was born in Virginia City, Nevada, on October 17, 1874, the daughter of Wales Averill and Christina McLaughlin. Her mother was born on Prince Edward Island in 1840. Her father was born in Highgate Springs, Vermont, in 1837. He was descended from English colonists. The progenitor of the family in the United States was William Averill, who settled at Ipswich, Massachusetts, in 1632. Among his descendants was John T. Averill, who served in the war of the Revolution.

Haas lived in Nevada until 1888 and was educated in public schools in Nevada and California. She then moved to Iowa, where she graduated from Cedar Rapids High School. From 1894 to 1896, she attended University of Michigan in Ann Arbor, where she joined the university's chapter of the sorority Delta Delta Delta. She attended the University of California and obtained degrees of Bachelor of Arts and Doctor of Jurisprudence.

== Career ==
Before moving back to California in 1900, Harriet A. Haas was Assistant Superintendent at the Massachusetts Reformatory for Women, Framingham, Massachusetts.

From 1915 to 1924, she served as president of the building association for Delta Delta Delta sorority.

She was a member of Piedmont Board of Education from 1916 to 1926, assuming the role of chairman of the Finance Committee. She was also a practicing attorney in Oakland. In 1922, she obtained an A.B. from University of California, Berkeley, her thesis being Financing of the Secondary and Elementary Schools. During this period, she was the legal aid adviser for both the women's section of the Berkeley Police Department and the Berkeley Welfare Society. In Oakland, California, she served on a forum committee on women's legal status while serving on a committee for the League of Women Voters at the state level. She was on the Speakers' Bureau of County Federation of Women's Clubs and Community Chest.

In 1926, Haas ran as the only woman candidate for legislature in the country for the California State Assembly in the 37th District, in what is now the California 15th State Assembly district. She opposed the incumbent, Assemblyman Eugene W. Roland, and Walter Fleberling. She registered as Republican but sought the votes of both Republicans and Democrats. She lost by 10% and placed second of four candidates.

Later in life, she associated with Lila R. Havens and was assistant manager in the sale and development of the properties owned by the estate of Frank C. Havens, which was considered one of the largest and most beautifully located of any of the East Bay properties.

She was the dean of Iota chapter of the Kappa Beta Phi legal sorority. She was member and director of the Oakland Women's City Club.

She was a member of the State Bar Association, Women's Athletic Club, Business and Professional Women's Club of Oakland, American Association of University Women, Daughters of the American Revolution, Kappa Beta Phi legal sorority, Unitarian church, Order of the Eastern Star, Boalt Hall of Law of the University of California, College Women’s Club of Berkeley.

== Personal life ==
In 1897, Averill married Benjamin G. Haas in Carson, Nevada, and had two children: Dr. Wales Averill Haas, chief surgeon for the Six Companies Inc. at Boulder City, Nevada, and Lesben Louis Haas. Averill Haas moved to California in 1900 and lived at 218 Bonita Ave., Piedmont, California. Her husband died in 1946; she survived him until at least 1951, when she published a story in a magazine.
