= Harriet Bossnot =

American social worker

- Born: La Crosse, Wisconsin, U.S.
- Occupation: Social worker
- Spouse: Francis Forrest Bossnot
- Children: 1

Harriet Bossnot was an American social and civic worker, and the first vice president of the Montana Federation of Women's Clubs.

== Early life ==
Harriet Bossnot was born in La Crosse, Wisconsin, the daughter of E. Markle.

== Career ==
She was an active social and civic worker. She was the first vice president of the Montana Federation of Women's Clubs and chairman of county organization. In 1928 she was elected state president of the Montana Federation of Women's Clubs.

She was secretary and treasurer of local Library Board, and a member of the Havre Woman's Club and Order of the Eastern Star.

In 1930 she was nominated, with eight other prominent representatives from all sections of Montana, to a committee to establish an efficient, stable, permanent organization to assist in Montana economic development.

In 1950 she was nominated for a seat on the board of directors of the Montana Tuberculosis Association.

== Personal life ==
Harriet Bossnot moved to Montana in 1902 and lived in Havre, Montana. She married Francis Forrest Bossnot, a contractor and builder with Fuller and Bossnot, and had one daughter, Lillian Carolyn Bossnot.
