= Georgiana Blankenship =

American writer

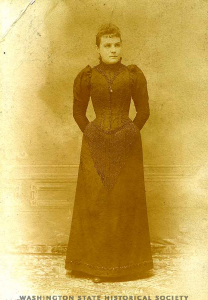
Georgiana M. Blankenship

Georgiana Smith Blankenship (née Mitchell; 1861 - January 9, 1936) wrote "Early History of Thurston County, Washington: Together with Biographies and Reminiscences of Those Identified with Pioneer Days".

== Biography ==
Born in 1861 in St. Paul, Minnesota, the daughter of George Mitchell and Elizabeth Pennimer, Blankenship was a writer identified with fraternal and club activities and was always interested in educational work. She was a member of the Olympia Woman's Club and Order of the Eastern Star. She was an officer of the Pioneer and Historical Society of Thurston County in Olympia. The Society was organized on March 2, 1910, and the requirement to be part of it was to have resided in the county for forty or more years. In 1914, she wrote "Early History of Thurston County, Washington: Together with Biographies and Reminiscences of Those Identified with Pioneer Days".

Blankenship lived in California and moved to Washington State in 1890, where she lived at East Bay Drive, Olympia, Washington. She first married a man surnamed Smith. Later she married George Edward Blankenship (1858-1947); they had one daughter, Marion Ruth, later Mrs. Abel.

She died on January 9, 1936, aged 74, and is buried at Masonic Memorial Park, Tumwater, Washington.

== Publications ==
She was the author of Tillicum Tales of Thurston County, a historical and reminiscent book.
