= Thora B. Gardiner =

Icelandic-American club woman

Thora B. Gardiner (March 17, 1884 – November 13, 1953) was an American club woman.

== Early life ==
Thora B. Gardiner was born in Holum, Iceland, on March 17, 1884, the daughter of Benedict Johnson and Thorbjorg Arnadottir. The family moved to the United States in 1901.

== Career ==
Thora B. Gardiner was active in civic, club and church affairs. During and after the war, she was the secretary of the County Chapter of the American Red Cross.

She was on the school board and was instrumental in the founding of Oregon City High School, Barclay School, Eastham School and the merging of Park Place District with Oregon City and the founding of the Park Place School and the addition for the Mt. Pleasant School. One of the middle schools (grades 6–8) of the Oregon City School District, founded in 1954, is named after Thora B. Gardiner.

She was the President of the Oregon City Women's Club and Vice-president and Secretary of the Clackamas County Public Health Association.

She was a member of the Order of the Eastern Star, Parent-Teacher Association, American Yeoman, St. Paul's Episcopal Church, Auxiliary and Alter Guild.

== Personal life ==
Thora B. Gardiner moved to Oregon in 1912 and lived at 1305 J. Q. Adams St., Oregon City, Oregon.

On November 7, 1901, in Hamilton, North Dakota, she married Frederick William Gardiner and had three children: Benedict Edward "Ned" Gardiner, Frederick William Gardiner, Rosemary Gardiner Keeney.

She died on November 13, 1953, and is buried at Mountain View Cemetery, Oregon City.
