= Ella Frances Braman =

American lawyer

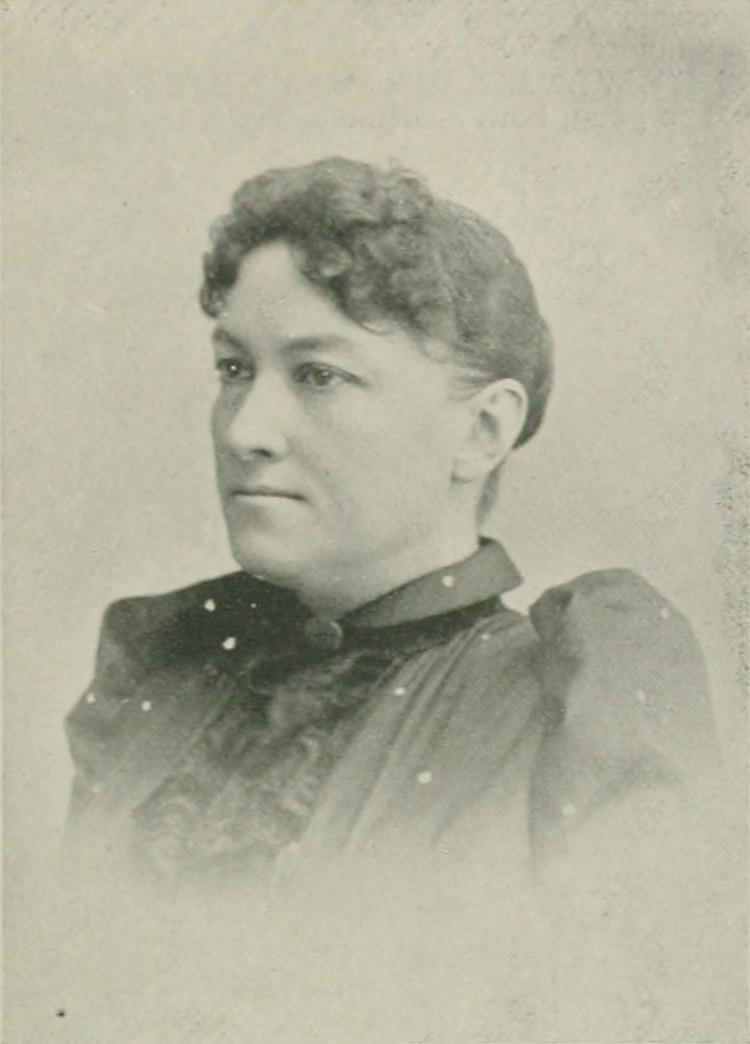
Ella Frances Braman, a "woman of the century"

Ella Frances Braman (March 23, 1850 – ?) was an American lawyer and business woman. She trained as a lawyer assisting her husband that she was recognised as a commissioner for different states so that she could deputise for her husband. After they moved to New York City, she became her husband's business partner. She held commissions from Presidents Franklin D. Roosevelt and William Henry Harrison, as well as Governors of principal States and Territories, including Alaska and Puerto Rico. She was a notary public and commissioner of deeds for the District of Columbia, United States Court of Claims and a commissioner of deeds for New York City, as well as a passport, consular, and naturalization agent.

== Early years ==
Ella Frances Collins and her twin, Edgar Frances, were born in Brighton, Boston, Massachusetts, March 23, 1850, to Abram Wing Collins and Sophronia Swift (Ellis) Collins. She was of Puritans ancestry. Her other siblings included Bathsheba Ellia, Elizabeth Burgess, Abram Wing Collins, Jr., Betsie Howes Doane, Adela Rebecca Collins, Williams Ellis Collins, Harriet Ferdinand Nye Collins, Mary Gleason Collins, and Fred Swift Collins.

== Career ==
On September 10, 1867, she married Joseph Balch Braman, of Brighton, then a member of the Boston Bar. Their children were Susan Caroline (b. 1870), Joseph Chandler (b. 1872): Ella Angela (b. 1874); and Joseph Herbert (b. 1875).

In 1872, they went to Los Angeles, California, where her husband practiced law until the spring of 1874, when he resumed law practice in Boston. Soon after their return to Boston, Mr. Braman required someone to assist him in his Boston office as commissioner for the different states to which he had just been appointed, and Mrs. Braman volunteered to become his assistant. She proved so competent that it was decided to ask for her appointment also, so that she could act, especially when clients called for a commissioner during Mr. Braman's temporary absence from the office. Each State governor was written to. Governor John Davis Long adding his endorsement, but only ten governors could then be found who either believed in a woman's being appointed or thought they had the power to grant the commission to a woman. Soon Mr. and Mrs. Braman removed to New York City to practice, and then it was determined to continue asking for the appointments from the governors until she had them all. By 1893, she lacked only about eight States. President William Henry Harrison gave her the commissions.

Soon after settling in the metropolis, she became a regular partner with her husband. They had a downtown day office in the Equitable Building, 120 Broadway, and an uptown office and residence at 1270 Broadway. Mrs. Braman was a lawyer, notary public, a commissioner of deeds for the States, Territories and District of Columbia, the United States Court of Claims, a United States passport agent at New York, and a consular agent. She held about fifty commissions and appointments from the President of the United States and from governors of States. Mrs Braman's uptown office was in her residence, and it was never closed. Her theory seemed to be that a person who carries on business should always be ready to attend to business, and to that end, her office was kept open, night and day, every day in the year, making no exception even for Sundays and holidays. Here, she kept the laws, blanks and forms for all the States.

Mecca Temple Shrine conferred upon her its ladies' degree; she was a member of Alpha Chapter No. 1, Order of the Eastern Star.
