= Order of the Eastern Star =

Freemasonry-related fraternal organization

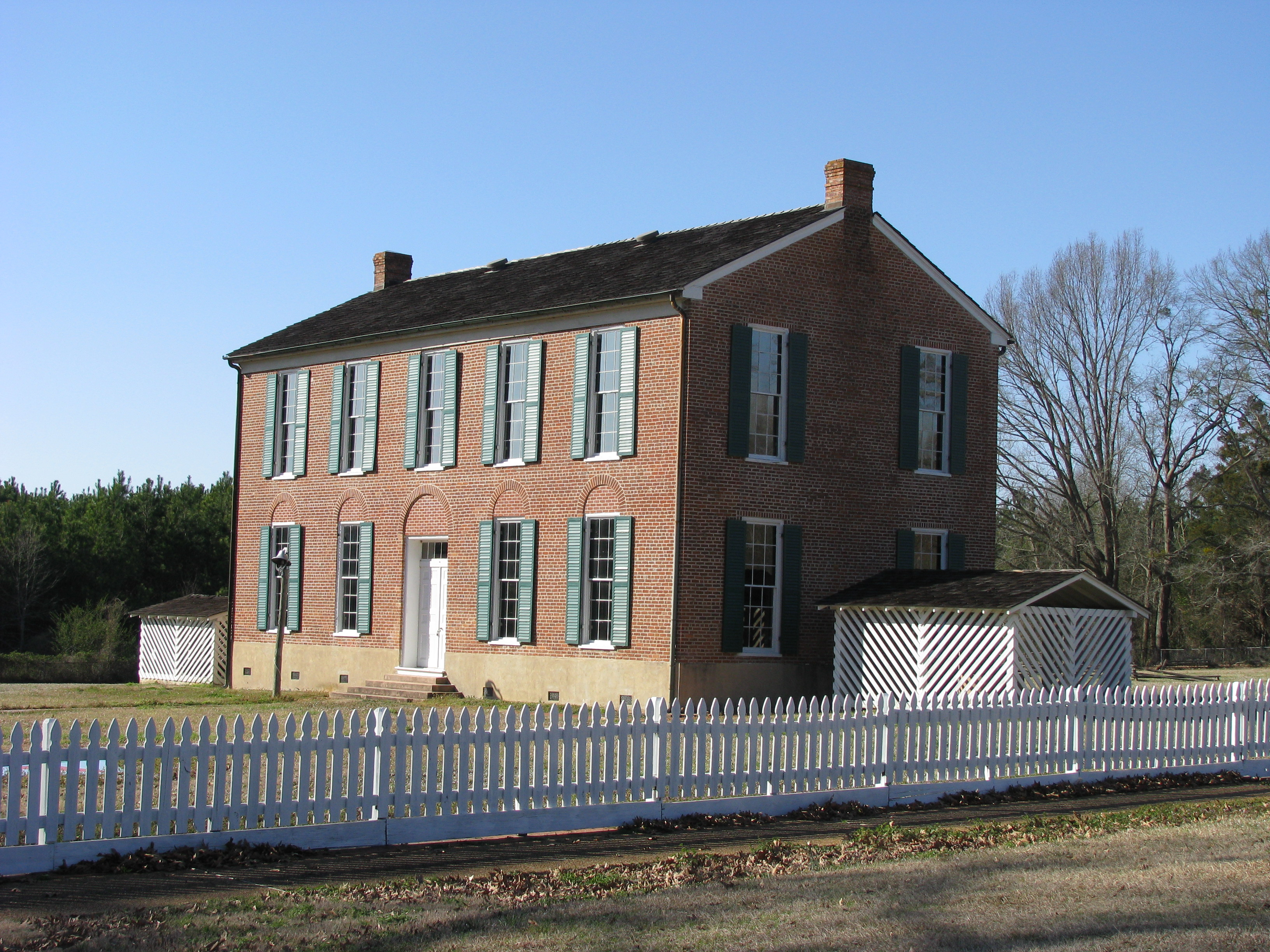
Eureka Masonic College, also known as The Little Red Schoolhouse, birthplace of the Order of the Eastern Star

The Order of the Eastern Star (OES) is a Masonic appendant body open to both men and women. It was established in 1850 by lawyer and educator Rob Morris, a noted Freemason, and adopted and approved as an appendant body of the Masonic Fraternity in 1873. The order is based on teachings from the Bible and is open to people of all religious beliefs. It has approximately 10,000 chapters in 18 countries and approximately 500,000 members under its General Grand Chapter.

Applicants must be of good moral character, believe in a Supreme Being, and be willing to assume the obligation of the Order. Members of the Order of the Eastern Star are aged 18 and older and be one of the following:

- Any Master Mason in good standing.
- Women who are relatives of past or present Master Masons in good standing of a regular Lodge of the Masonic Fraternity. The relationship is by birth, marriage or adoption.
- Women who are majority members of the International Order of the Rainbow for Girls or Job's Daughters International or have been an active member for 3 years, who have reached the age of 18.
- Women who are at least 18 years of age who are sponsored by two members, a Sister and a Brother.

Originally, a woman would have to be the daughter, widow, wife, sister, or mother of a Master Mason. The Order now allows other relatives as well as allowing Job's Daughters, Rainbow Girls and Members of the Organization of Triangles (in New York) to become members when of age.

== History ==
General Grand Chapter logo

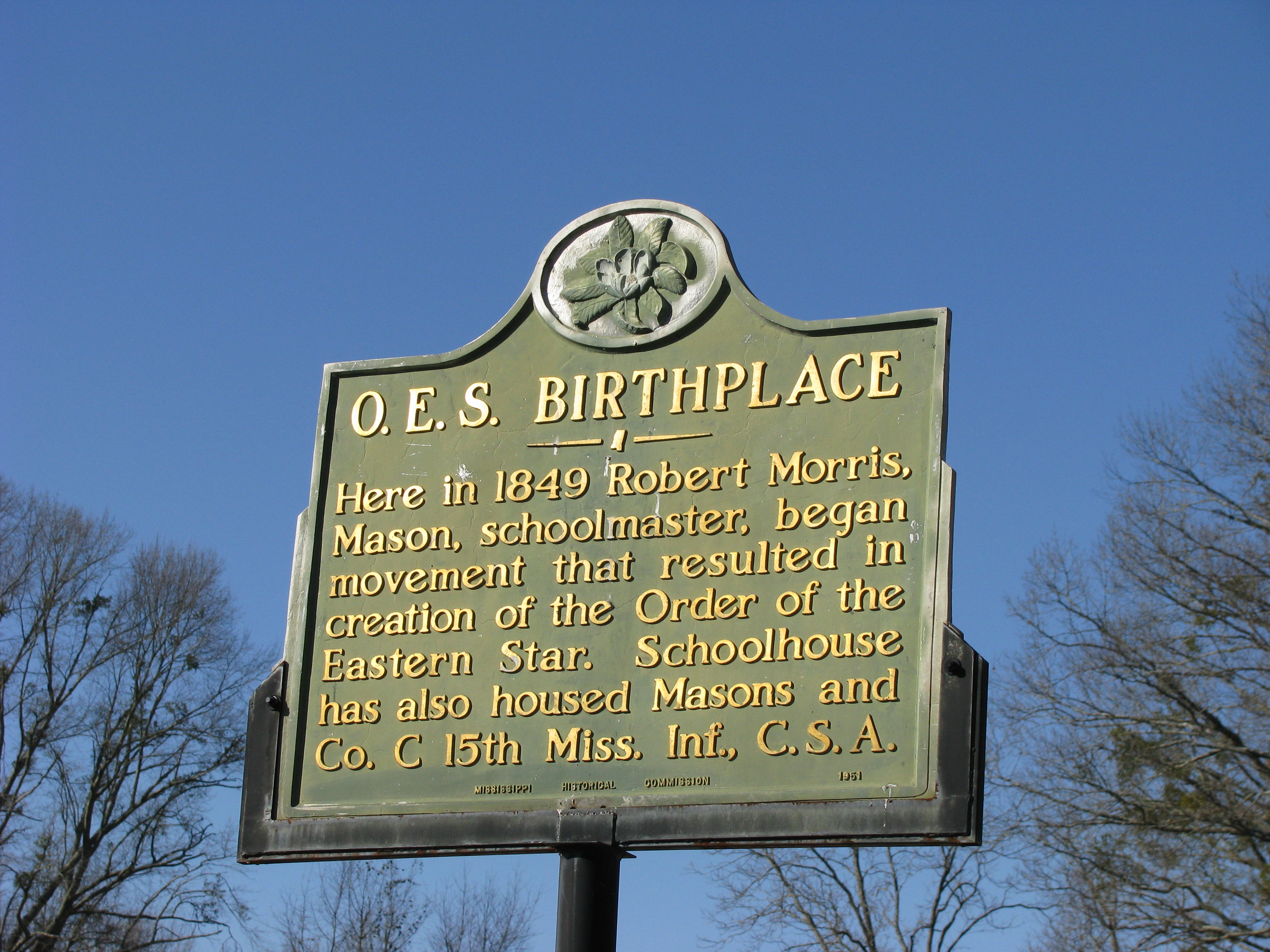
Signage at the Order of the Eastern Star birthplace, the Little Red Schoolhouse

The Order was created by Rob Morris in 1850 when he was teaching at the Eureka Masonic College in Richland, Mississippi. While confined by illness, he set down the principles of the order in his Rosary of the Eastern Star. By 1855, he had organized a "Supreme Constellation" in New York, which chartered chapters throughout the United States.

In 1866, Dr. Morris started working with Robert Macoy, and handed the Order over to him while Morris was traveling in the Holy Land. Macoy organized the current system of Chapters, and modified Dr. Morris' Rosary into a Ritual.

Similarly to Freemasonry, the Order of Eastern Star was not open to African Americans. Prince Hall Freemasonry was formed in 1784 and the first Prince Hall Order of the Eastern Star chapter was founded on December 1, 1874, titled, Queen Esther Chapter, No. 1, and established in Washington, D.C. by Thornton Andrew Jackson.

The "General Grand Chapter" was formed in Indianapolis, Indiana on November 6, 1876. Committees formed at that time created the Ritual of the Order of the Eastern Star in more or less its current form.

== Emblem and heroines ==
The emblem of the Order is a five-pointed star with the white ray of the star pointing downwards towards the manger. The meaning of the letters FATAL surrounding the center pentagon in the emblem is only revealed to members of the Order. In the Chapter room, the downward-pointing white ray points to the West. The character-building lessons taught in the Order are stories inspired by Biblical figures:

- Adah, Jephthah's daughter from the Book of Judges. In Eastern Star, Adah is represented by the color blue and a sword and veil. Adah represents the virtue of obedience. It is noted that the name "Adah" is not described in the Bible, also, the Bible does not explicitly state that Jephthah sacrificed his daughter. It focuses on her dedication to the Lord, which some interpret as a lifelong service at the tabernacle, while others believe it involved a more literal sacrifice.
- Ruth, the widow from the Book of Ruth. In Eastern Star, Ruth is represented by the color yellow and a sheaf of barley. Ruth represents the virtue of religious principles.
- Esther, the wife from the Book of Esther. In Eastern Star, Esther is represented by the color white and a crown and scepter. Esther represents the virtue of loyalty.
- Martha, sister of Mary and Lazarus, from the Gospel of Luke and the Gospel of John. In Eastern Star, Martha is represented by the color green and a broken column. Martha represents the virtue of endurance in trial.
- Electa, the "elect lady" from II John. In Eastern Star, Electa is represented by the color red and a chalice. Electa represents the virtue of endurance of persecution.

== Officers ==
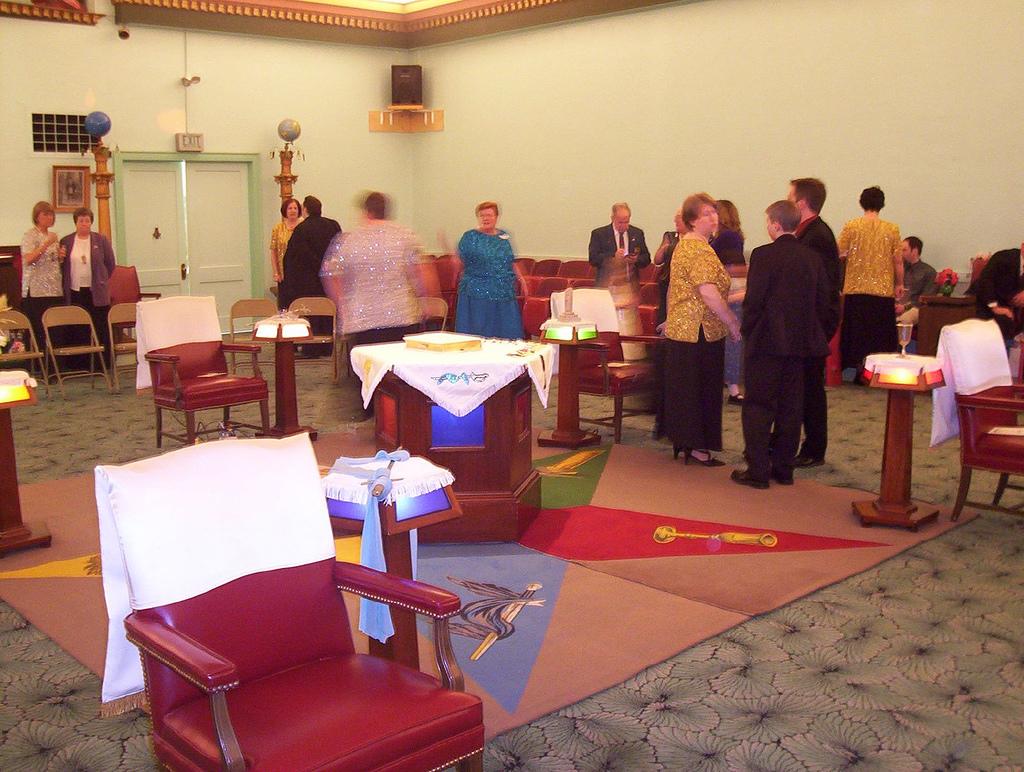
Officers representing the heroines of the order sit around the altar in the center of the chapter room.

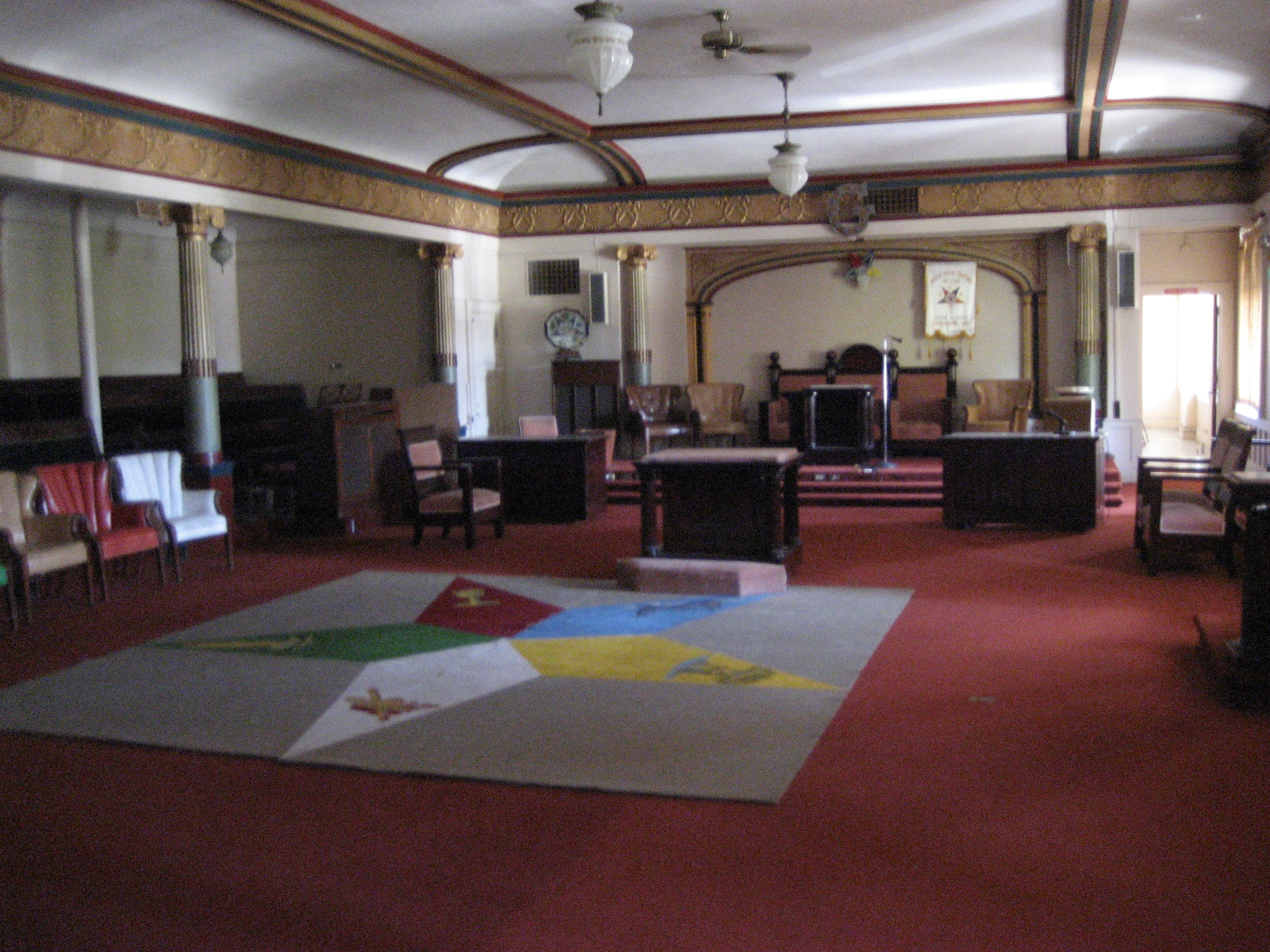
Eastern Star meeting room

There are 18 main officers in a full chapter:

- Worthy Matron – presiding officer
- Worthy Patron – a Master Mason who provides general supervision
- Associate Matron – assumes the duties of the Worthy Matron in the absence of that officer
- Associate Patron – assumes the duties of the Worthy Patron in the absence of that officer
- Secretary – takes care of all correspondence and minutes
- Treasurer – takes care of monies of the Chapter
- Conductress – Leads visitors and initiations.
- Associate Conductress – Prepares candidates for initiation, assists the conductress with introductions and handles the ballot box.
- Chaplain – leads the Chapter in prayer
- Marshal – presents the Flag and leads in all ceremonies
- Organist – provides music for the meetings
- Adah – Shares the lesson of Duty of Obedience to the will of God
- Ruth – Shares the lesson of Honor and Justice
- Esther – Shares the lesson of Loyalty to Family and Friends
- Martha – Shares the lesson of Faith and Trust in God and Everlasting Life
- Electa – Shares the lesson of Charity and Hospitality
- Warder – Sits next to the door inside the meeting room, to make sure those that enter the chapter room are members of the Order.
- Sentinel – Sits next to the door outside the chapter room, to ensure people who wish to enter are members of the Order.

Traditionally, a woman who is elected Associate Conductress will be elected to Conductress the following year, then the next year Associate Matron, and the next year Worthy Matron. A man elected Associate Patron will usually be elected Worthy Patron the following year. Usually, the woman who is elected to become Associate Matron will let it be known who she wishes to be her Associate Patron, so the next year they will both go to the East together as Worthy Matron and Worthy Patron. There is no male counterpart to the Conductress and Associate Conductress. Only women are allowed to be Matrons, Conductresses, and the Star Points (Adah, Ruth, etc.) and only men can be Patrons.

Once a member has served a term as Worthy Matron or Worthy Patron, they may use the post-nominal letters, PM or PP respectively.

== Headquarters ==
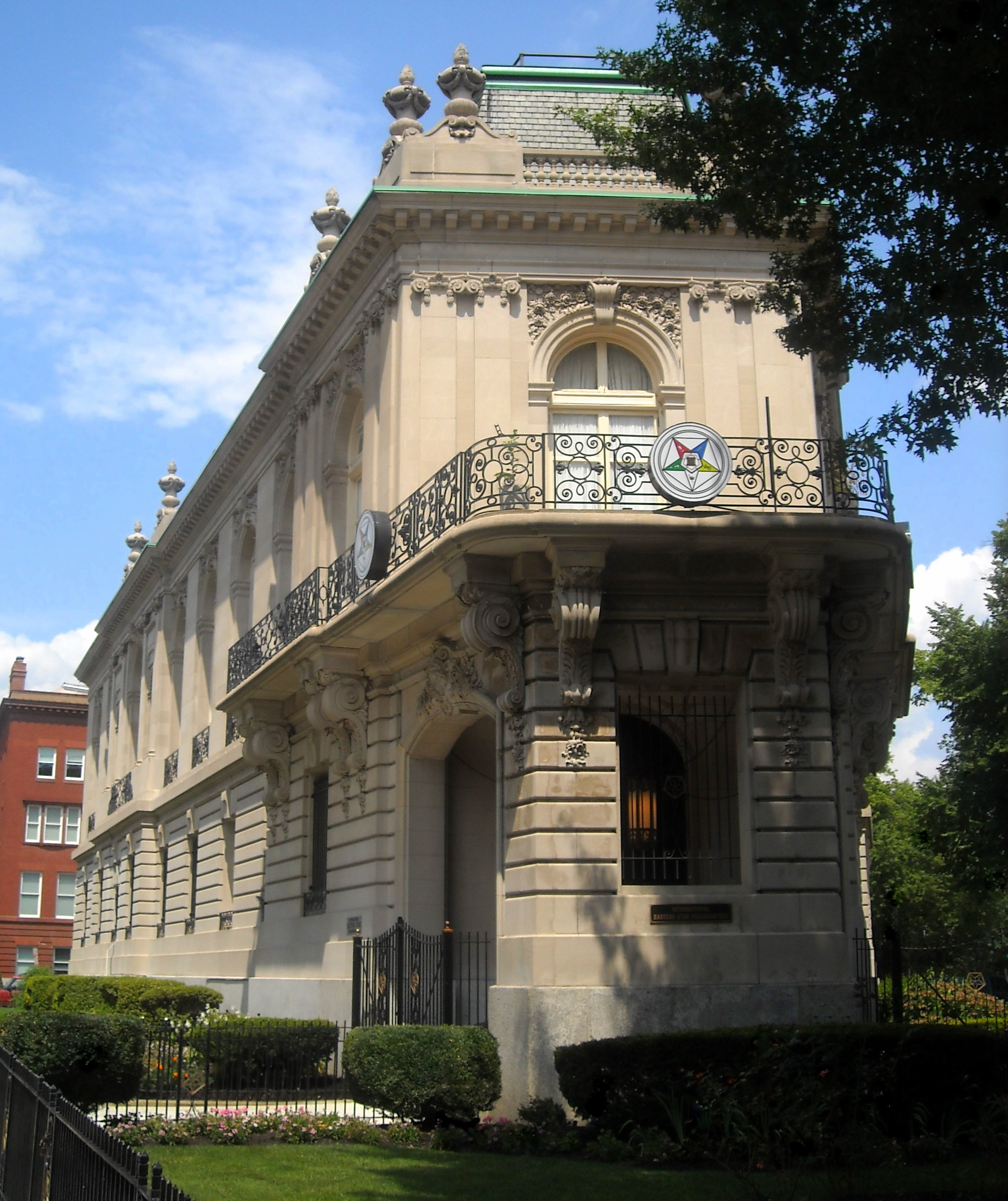
The International Temple in Washington, D.C.

The General Grand Chapter headquarters, the International Temple, is located in the Dupont Circle neighborhood of Washington, D.C., in the Perry Belmont Mansion. The mansion was built in 1909 for the purpose of entertaining the guests of Perry Belmont. They included Britain's Prince of Wales in 1919. General Grand Chapter purchased the building in 1935. The secretary of the General Grand Chapter lives there while serving his or her term of office. The mansion features works of art from around the world, most of which were given as gifts from various international Eastern Star chapters.

== Charities ==
The Order has a charitable foundation and from 1986 to 2001 contributed $513,147 to Alzheimer's disease research, juvenile diabetes research, and juvenile asthma research. It also provides bursaries to students of theology and religious music, as well as other scholarships that differ by jurisdiction. In 2000 over $83,000 was donated. Many jurisdictions support a Masonic and/or Eastern Star retirement center or nursing home for older members; some homes are also open to the public. The Elizabeth Bentley OES Scholarship Fund was started in 1947.

== Notable members ==
- Kate M. Ainey
- Eliza Allen
- Clara Barton
- Clara Nettie Bates
- Cora M. Beach
- Ollie Josephine Prescott Baird Bennett
- Emma Plummer Chadwick
- Aletha Gilbert
- Beatrice Gjertsen Bessesen
- Ella A. Bigelow
- Dorcas Reilly
- Georgiana M. Blankenship
- Harriet Bossnot
- Emma Eliza Bower
- Gene Bradford
- Ella Frances Braman
- Bernice Cameron
- Edith Daley
- Nannie C. Dunsmoor
- Addie C. Strong Engle
- Laura J. Frakes
- Thora B. Gardiner
- Bertha Lund Glaeser
- Sabra R. Greenhalgh
- Harriet A. Haas
- Sarah C. Hall
- Kate Stevens Harpel
- Sallie Foster Harshbarger
- Jane Denio Hutchison
- Vernettie O. Ivy
- Nannie S. Brown Kramer
- Jeanette Lawrence
- Ingrid Lewis-Martin
- Mab Copland Lineman
- Edith Bolte MacCracken
- Eva McGown
- Rebecca B. Mellors
- Sara E. Morse
- Vesta C. Muehleisen
- Kate Pier
- Lorraine J. Pitkin
- Grace Gimmini Potts
- Jennie Phelps Purvis
- Lois Randolph
- Mayme Schweble
- M. Elizabeth Shellabarger
- Caroline Estes Smith
- Lura Eugenie Brown Smith
- Lee Emmett Thomas
- Jeannette Throckmorton (1883–1963), president, State Society of Iowa Medical Women
- Violet Richardson Ward
- Nellie A. White
- Laura Ingalls Wilder

== Prince Hall OES ==
The Prince Hall Order of the Eastern Star is a predominantly African-American version of OES, associated with Prince Hall Freemasonry.

== See also ==
- Achoth
- Eastern Star Home
- Omega Epsilon Sigma
