= Alice La Mazière =

French journalist, socialist and feminist activist

Alice La Mazière (née Kühn; 1880-1962) was a French journalist, socialist and feminist activist.

== Career as a journalist ==
Alice La Mazière started her career during World War I: she published an article on women working to sort objects coming from the war front in la Revue de Paris. She was a journalist for the newspaper La Fronde, the first newspaper in the world to be entirely conceived and supervised by women.

== Activism ==
Alice La Mazière was a member of the French Union for Women's Suffrage and active within the French Section of the Worker's International (SFIO). She was a candidate to municipal elections in Paris in 1919 although women did not yet have the right to vote or to be elected in France at that time. Several Communist women did the same in the 1925 municipal elections.

She also contributed to the creation of the Soroptimist-Club of Paris, which was established by Suzanne Noël, and she was its president until 1926.

== Private life ==
Alice La Mazière was married to Pierre La Mazière, a journalist and writer. They are buried together in the Père-Lachaise cemetery in Paris.

== Books ==
As listed on Data.bnf.fr:

- With Suzanne Grinberg, Carrières féminines, nouvelles écoles, nouveaux métiers, nouvelles professions, Brochures Larousse, Paris : Larousse, 1917.
- En Tchécoslovaquie hier et aujourd'hui, Paris : Fasquelle, 1938.
- Le Maroc secret, Paris: éditions Baudinière, 1932.
- Neuvième congrès de l'Alliance internationale pour le suffrage des femmes (Rome, 12-19 mai 1923), Paris, Union française pour le suffrage des femmes, (s. d.).
- Nouvelle Espagne, Paris: éditions Baudinière, 1933.
- Sauvons les bébés, Niort : impr. de A. Chiron, 1920, 10p.
