= Soroptimist International =

Worldwide volunteer service organization for women

- Predecessor: Soroptimist Club, Oakland, California, US (founded October 3, 1921)
- Formation: 1921; 105 years ago
- Type: NGO
- Headquarters: Suite 1, 28 St. Thomas Place, Ely, CB7 4EX, United Kingdom
- Website: https://www.soroptimistinternational.org

Soroptimist International (SI), founded in 1921, is a global volunteer service for women with almost 66,000 members in 118 countries worldwide. Soroptimist International includes associate membership and e-clubs.

Soroptimist International has special consultative status at the Economic and Social Council (ECOSOC) at the United Nations, which gives it a voice on important discussion papers. It also allows them to attend the Commission of the Status of Women in New York each year where the Soroptimist International President leads a delegation.

Every two years, Soroptimist International launches a Soroptimist International President's Appeal.

== Etymology ==
The name "Soroptimist" was coined by combining the Latin words soror "sister" and optima "best", and can be taken to mean "best for women."

== Founding and history ==
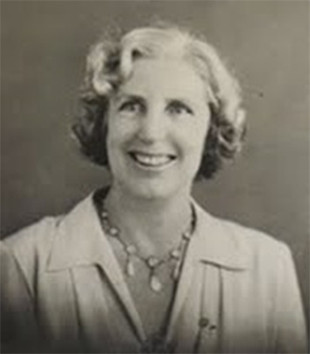
Violet Richardson Ward

The organization has its roots in the Soroptimist movement, started in the U.S. in 1921 by Stuart Morrow, and in particular in the Soroptimist Club of Oakland, California, founded that same year, with Violet Richardson as president. Eloise B. Cushing did the major writing of the organization's first constitution and by-laws, which was required to file for the charter; this document went on to serve as the guidelines for all the national and international Soroptimist clubs.

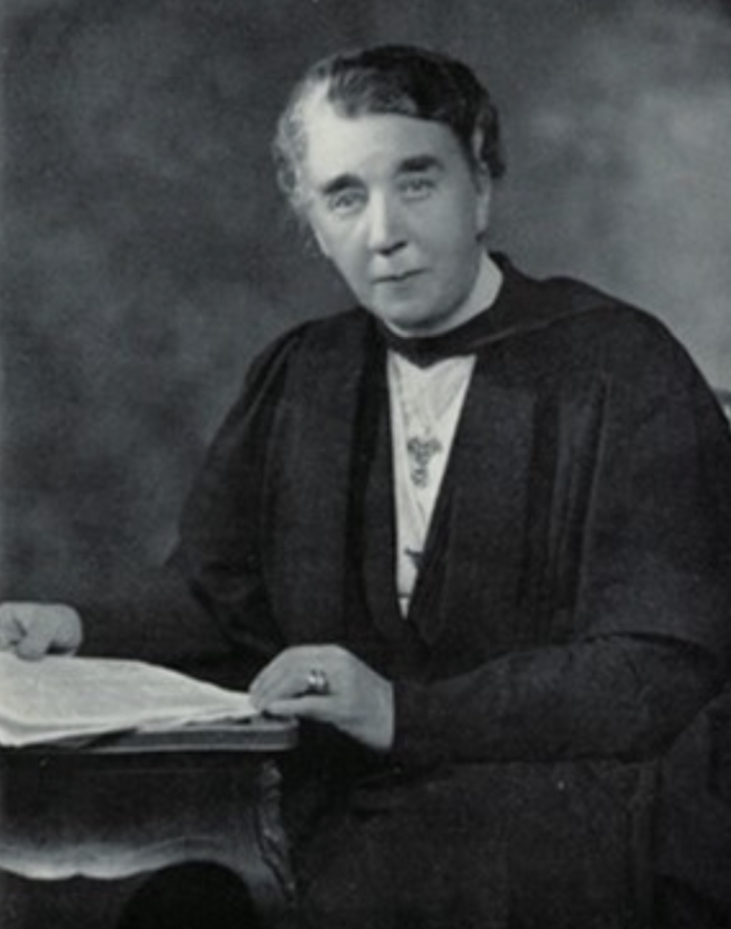
Eleanor Addison Phillips

In parallel, in May 1920, a Venture Club was formed in Bristol, UK, with encouragement by the Bristol Rotary Club (formed in 1917) with Eleanor Addison Phillips (headmistress of Clifton High School, Bristol) as founder and its first president. In 1930, when it was realised that Venture Clubs and Soroptimist Clubs had shared goals, the two organisations amalgamated. In July 2021, to commemorate 100 years of the Bristol Club (and celebrate Eleanor Addison Phillips), a blue plaque was unveiled at Clifton High School.

Sources agree that the Soroptimist movement was influenced by the existence of Rotarianism, though sources differ on the precise relationship between the two. For instance, Davis, in reference to early Soroptimism in the U.S., wrote that Soroptimism was a women's organisation connected to the Rotary Clubs for men that promoted the support of professional women as well as the ideals of service and internationalism. By contrast, Doughan wrote that the Soroptimist movement in Britain originally arose as a reaction against Rotarian and other masculinism among women who saw similar opportunities for service, but had no connection with Rotary men, or even if they did, were unwilling to accept the subordinate position implied by the structure of the Inner Wheel.

The Soroptimist Club of London was started in 1923 and received its charter in 1924 from Morrow. Its founding members included George Bernard Shaw's secretary. Other early members included Sybil Thorndike, Flora Drummond, and Mary Allen. The Soroptimist International of London Mayfair commissioned a painted enamel President's badge in 1946 from Arts and Crafts enameller Ernestine Mills, paying seven guineas for it. The design included their founding date of 1942 and commemorates the Alpha Club, founded in 1928, from which they grew, with the chain listing the names of the club's presidents from 1942 to 2006. These included Olympic fencer Elizabeth Carnegy-Arbuthnott and comedian Helena Millais. The chain is now held at the V&A Museum. Mills was a member of the Soroptimist Greater London club, for which she created an enamelled President's badge in 1933.

The federation, Soroptimist International of Great Britain & Ireland (SIGBI), was officially formed in 1934.

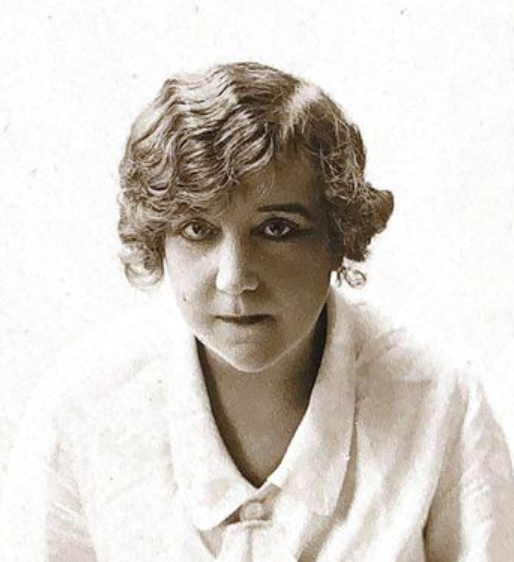
Suzanne Noël

From 1924 onwards, Suzanne Noël was highly instrumental in the growth of Soroptimism. Inspired by Morrow, who had come to Paris, Noël founded a Soroptimist Club in that city that year, whose membership included Thérèse Bertrand-Fontaine, Cécile Brunschvicg, Anna de Noailles, and Jeanne Lanvin Alice La Mazière. With the support of her Soroptimist contacts, Noël rapidly expanded Soroptimist internationally, founding new clubs in the Netherlands (1927), Italy (1929), Austria (1929), Germany (1930), Belgium (1930), Switzerland (1930), Estonia (1931), India (1932), Norway (1933), Hungary (1934), and Denmark (1936). The inauguration of the first Lithuanian club was interrupted by the start of WWII.

Prior to WWII, Soroptimists worked to assist refugees fleeing unrest in central Europe. Many Soroptimists themselves ultimately fled from the Nazis' consolidation of power. In 1939, many members of the burgeoning Kaunas club were killed or deported. In 1943, Marthe Hirsch, the director of a chocolate factory and the first president of the Belgian Soroptimist Club, committed suicide to avoid arrest by the Gestapo.

After WWII, Noël resumed expansion. The Communist coup prevented her attempt to found a club in Czechoslovakia in 1948, but she was successful in Turkey (1949) and Greece (1950).

By 1952, at least one club existed in Australia, under the auspices of the Federation of Soroptimist Clubs of Great Britain and Ireland, which included clubs throughout the Commonwealth. Thelma Eileen Jarrett joined this club in 1952 and became a prominent international Soroptimist, being elected president of that Federation in 1972. In 1973, in Sydney, she chaired the first conference of the Federation to be held in the southern hemisphere.

c. 1988–1990, efforts by Soroptimists led to the founding of Caring for Carers Ireland.

At the World Summit for Social Development in March 1995, Soroptimist International advocated for girls and women to have universal access to basic education and equal access to higher education. It urged that summit to ensure that specific measures to achieve that goal would emerge from the Fourth World Conference on Women (Beijing, September 1995).

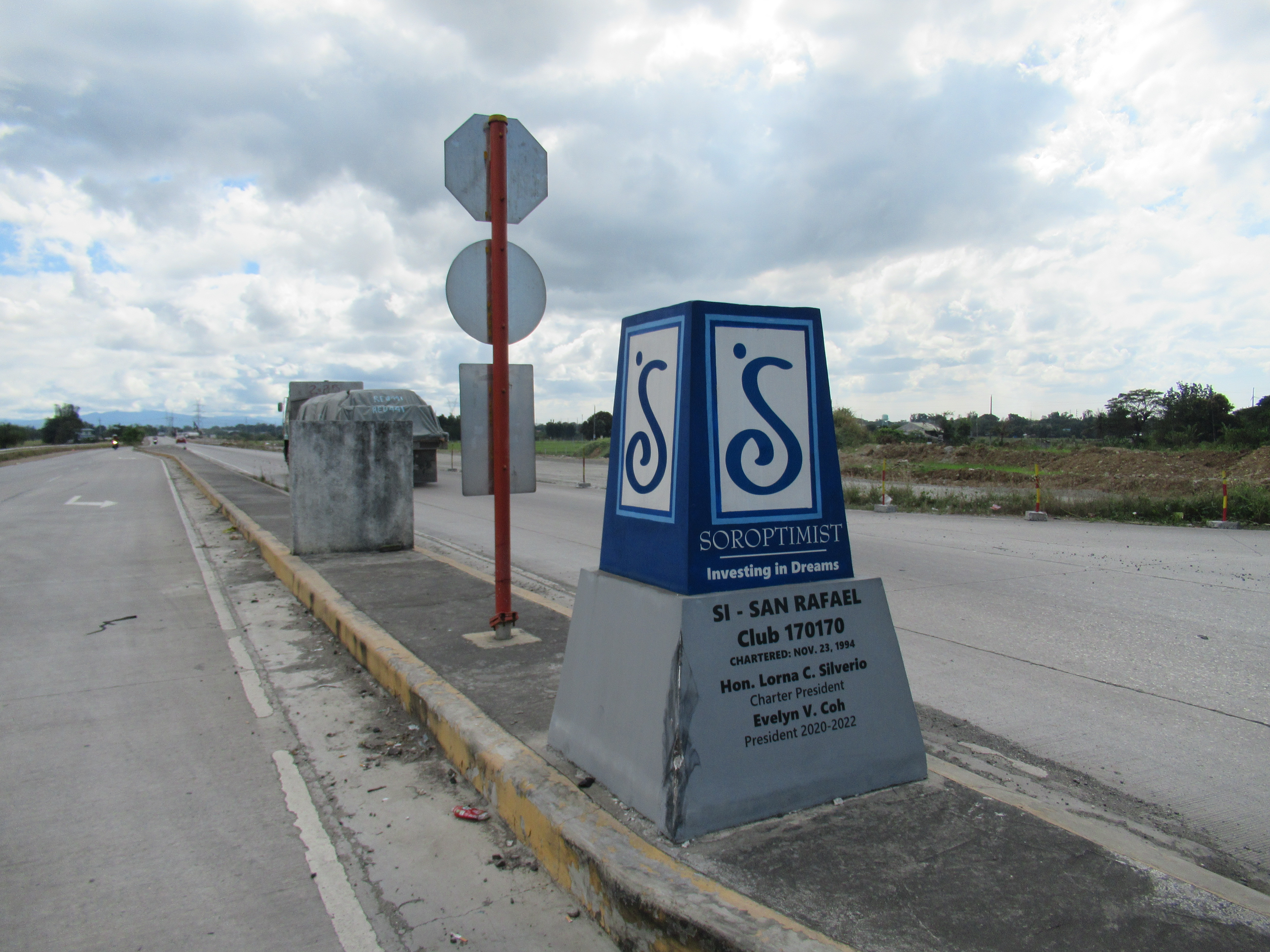
Soroptimist International Philippines marker

In the 2000s, Soroptimist International repeatedly reaffirmed its commitment to the Beijing Declaration, which emerged from the latter conference.

At least as early as 2003, Soroptimist International had gained consultative status with ECOSOC and official relations with the WHO.

In 2007, Soroptimist International initiated Project Sierra, a four-year project to help disadvantaged women and children in Sierra Leone, in partnership with the international charity Hope and Homes for Children.

The Soroptimist movement continues to provide practical assistance for women in need via means such as educational grants, domestic violence shelters, and mammograms.

== Structure and size ==
Soroptimist International is an umbrella organisation with its headquarters in Ely, UK. Within this umbrella, there are five federations: SI of the Americas (SIA); SI Great Britain and Ireland (SIGBI); SI of Europe (SIE); SI of South East Asia Pacific (SISEAP) and SI Africa (SIAF). Each of these federations in turn contain local clubs.

== Notable members ==
- Beatrice Afflerbach, founded of the Basel branch in Switzerland
- Mary Allen
- Mariama Bâ (1929 – 1981), Senegalese author, winner of the first Noma Award for Publishing in Africa
- Mary Creighton Bailey, president of the Canterbury branch.
- Thérèse Bertrand-Fontaine
- Margaret Blackwood
- Pauline Suing Bloom
- Nadia Boulanger
- Cécile Brunschvicg
- Teckla M. Carlson
- Gertrude Crocker
- Grace Cuthbert-Browne
- Mary Campbell Dawbarn
- Lucie Delarue-Mardrus
- Flora Drummond
- Nannie C. Dunsmoor
- Béatrix Dussane
- Oda Faulconer, President
- Mary Fisher
- Nellie A. Goodhue
- Winifred M. Hausam
- Ellinor Hinks
- Thelma Eileen Jarrett
- Jeanne Lanvin
- Lily Laskine
- Florence McClure founder of the Las Vegas, Nevada chapter and advocate for women and prisoners.
- Carrie Morrison
- Anna de Noailles
- Suzanne Noël
- Eleanor Addison Phillips
- Kathleen Rutherford
- Geneve L. A. Shaffer
- Mary Jane Spurlin
- Daphne Steele
- Mary Sykes
- Violet Richardson Ward
- Ida V. Wells
- Madrid Williams

== See also ==
- Feminism
- Soroptimist Park

== Bibliography ==
- Fisher, Lillian E. (1983). Violet Richardson Ward: Founder-President of Soroptimist. Vantage Press. ISBN 0533055636.
- Haywood, Janet (1995). The History of Soroptimist International. Soroptimist International. ISBN 0952378809.
