= Madrid Williams =

Madrid Loyd Williams
- Born: Madrid Loyd; January 16, 1911; Aragon, Georgia, United States
- Died: 1993 (aged 81–82)
- Spouse: Grant Williams

Madrid Loyd Williams (January 16, 1911 – 1993; /ˈmeɪdrɪd/ MAY-drid) was an American executive who, despite never finishing high school or attending college, served as executive director of the Georgia Bar Association. She was known as the "first lady" of the State Bar.

== Early life ==
Williams was born in Aragon, Georgia on January 16, 1911, to farmers Horace Cleveland Loyd and Mary Samford Loyd. She was the oldest of four children. After a few years the family moved from Aragon to Menlo, and finally to Macon in 1923. Williams' father worked on the Bibb County Courthouse, her mother sewed, and the family rented out the extra rooms of their house; nevertheless they were poor. Despite excelling in school, Williams dropped out at the age of 15 to help her family make ends meet, eventually working full-time as a secretary at Macon law firm Harris, Harris, Russell and Weaver.

== Career ==
In 1942, Williams began working for the Georgia Bar Association as executive secretary in the organization's new permanent offices in Macon. During her more than three decades with the bar, she climbed the organization's ranks and finally became executive director. Williams oversaw massive growth in the organization, which in 1964 officially became the State Bar of Georgia. When governor Carl Sanders held a bill-signing ceremony for the Unified Bar Bill, announcing the creation of a unified state bar on March 11, 1963, she was the only woman present. Williams also was administrative editor of the Georgia Bar Journal. In 1972 she was instrumental in the relocation of the Bar offices from Macon to Atlanta.

She served as president of the National Association of Bar Executives in 1970, one of the first three women to do so. She was also a member of the State Bar Board of Governors, served on the Board of Continuing Legal Education, was a member of the State Disciplinary Board, and was secretary of the Georgia Bar Foundation. She retired in 1976.

== Personal life and legacy ==
Williams married Grant Williams in 1934.

After her retirement, Williams was deeply involved with Soroptimist International. Additionally, she co-founded St. Andrews Presbyterian Church in Macon; she was the church's first female Clerk of Session. Later she was elected as the first female deacon at Vineville Presbyterian Church.

Williams also had a love for gardening. She had no children.

Madrid Williams died in 1993.

In 2010, Williams was inducted into the Georgia Women of Achievement Hall of Fame.
