= Nellie A. Goodhue =

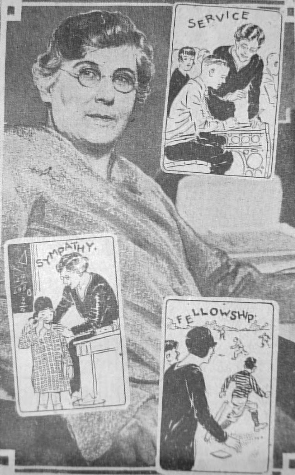
Nellie A. Goodhue

Nellie A. Goodhue (September 20, 1869 – July 19, 1957) made pioneering contributions to the education of handicapped and exceptional children. Working with the University of Washington Goodhue participated in studies to evaluate the background and educational abilities of children with special needs and conducted clinics to assist in the development of special classes.

== Early life ==
Goodhue was born on September 20, 1869, in Northfield, Minnesota, the daughter of Daniel Goodhue (1832–1902) and Ellen E. Stanton Goodhue (1844–1909).

== Career ==
She was director of the Child Study Department for the Seattle public schools and instructor for the Normal School.

In 1910 she taught the first class for Seattle students with mental disability. In 1912, working with the University of Washington, the Seattle Board of Education and the Cascade School, Goodhue participated in an extensive study on handicapped children evaluating their backgrounds, health status, learning abilities, motor skills, and other factors. Running extensive testing, the program was designed to develop training programs for disabled children and establish benchmarks for ongoing assessment. In an effort to share their information, Goodhue presented seminars to assist in the development of special education classes.

The needs of misfit pupils always interested her and when the Child Study Department of the Seattle public schools was organized, she became its first director in 1914. From 1916 to 1925 Goodhue led an unsuccessful campaign to establish a Western Washington Institution for the Feeble-minded. Because the Seattle School Board had a policy of excluding disabled students from public education, Goodhue campaigned for their inclusion and won the battle to include all students with IQs above 50. The department served 6,970 pupils during 1926–1927.

She was on the Board of Directors of the Local Chapter of the American Red Cross.

She was a member of the Soroptimist Club, State Association of the Executive Women in Education, State Mental Hygiene Society.

She was the first principal of Washington School and made pioneering contributions to the education of handicapped and exceptional children. The Shoreline Health and Guidance Center, at 13720 Roosevelt Way N., constructed in 1946 as an administrative building by the Shoreline School District, was turned into a center for mentally handicapped children in 1954. Against a policy of the Seattle School District policy that forbid to name school after living person, the school was dedicated to Goodhue. Nellie Goodhue School closed in June 1961.

== Personal life ==
She moved to Washington in 1908 and lived at 1407 E. 45th St., Seattle, Washington.

She died on July 19, 1957, and is buried at Oaklawn Cemetery, Northfield.

== Legacy ==
The Nellie Goodhue Group Homes at 1707 N 125th St, Seattle, provide staff supports for activities of daily living for people with intellectual disabilities.
