= Sophie Body-Gendrot =

French sociologist (1942–2018)

- Born: 30 October 1942; Verdun, Meuse, France
- Died: 21 September 2018 (aged 75); Paris, France
- Education: Collège Sévigné
- Alma mater: University of Paris; Sciences Po
- Occupations: Criminologist; Political scientist Sociologist
- Years active: 1964–2018
- Spouse: Alain Gendrot (m. 1970)
- Children: 2
- Awards: Chevalier of the Ordre des Palmes académiques Chevalier of the Legion of Honour

Sophie Body-Gendrot (French: [sɔfi bɔdi ʒɑ̃dʁo]; 30 October 1942 – 21 September 2018) was a French political scientist, criminologist and sociologist who specialised in security issues, urban violence, social inequality, and the discrimination young migrants suffered in the cities of Europe and America. She lectured at the Sciences Po, the University of New Orleans, the Middlebury College, Columbia University, New York University, the School for Advanced Studies in the Social Sciences, the Paris Nanterre University, Blaise Pascal University and Paris-Sorbonne University. Body-Gendrot was the author or co-editor of more than 20 books in English and French as well as more than 150 chapters and academic articles. She was a recipient of the Chevalier of the Ordre des Palmes académiques in 2005 and was appointed Chevalier of the Legion of Honour in 2012.

== Early life and education ==
Body-Gendrot was born in Verdun, Meuse on 30 October 1942. She was the daughter of the doctor Maurice Body and the painter Jacqueline Contant. Body-Gendrot was brought up in Verdun until the age of 17, and was educated at Lycée Margueritte in Verdun, then at Collège Sévigné in Paris. In 1963, she obtained a master's degree in English Studies at the University of Paris, earned her diploma on the American civil rights movement from Sciences Po in Paris five years later and achieved her post-state graduate degree in political science on school conflicts in New York from Sciences Po in 1979.

== Career ==
She took up the post as a reader in the English town of Walsall and then taught at the American Overseas School of Rome between 1964 and 1965. Body-Gendrot worked at a Cofremca opinion research institute and then educated students at the University of New Orleans before relocating to Paris in 1975 to work as an assistant to the Director of the Middlebury School in Paris. She was a teacher at the Middlebury College in Vermont. In 1980, Body-Gendrot earned a Tocqueville Fellowship and became a visiting scholar in international relations at Columbia University and in sociology at New York University from 1981 to 1983.

Following her training as an Americianist and a political scientist, she worked as a lecturer at the North American Centre of the School for Advanced Studies in the Social Sciences between 1982 and 1984. Body-Gendrot then worked as a lecturer at the Department of American Studies of the Paris Nanterre University from 1984 to 1986. In 1986, she began working at Sciences Po as a lecturer, and a year later, served as Director of Middlebury College in Paris for 100 graduate and undergraduate students until 1987. She was elected to become the Professor of American Civilization at Blaise Pascal University in Clermont-Ferrand from 1988 to 1991. In 1991, following her being enrolled on the Fulbright Program in the United States, Body-Genrot began working at Paris-Sorbonne University until 2011. She became director of the Center for Urban Studies in the English-Speaking World in 1994, promoting research in that field to advanced students and young researchers.

Between 1990 and 1997, she served as vice-president of the Association Française d'Études Américaines, and alongside Michel Granger, was co-editor-in-chief of Revue Française d'études américaines. Body-Gendrot was a member of the board at the Milton S. Eisenhower Foundation from 1998 to 2008, was on the advisory council of the French-American Foundation and was president of the European Society of Criminology between 2009 and 2011. She was a researcher at the Center for Sociological Research on Law and Penal Institutions from 1998 and was head of the European COST on the dynamics of violence from 2000 to 2003. Body-Gendrot was an expert of the Urban Age project at the London School of Economics from 2004, and for the European Union from 2009 and for the Council of Europe from 2012.

She was an appointee to the French Advisory Commission overseeing police misconduct between 2007 and 2011. In 2015, Body-Gendrot became a member of Academia Europaea. She also conducted seminars at CELSA Paris and École nationale d'administration. Body-Gendrot was on the editorial board of the Urbanisme and l'Esprit des cités magazines. She was the author or co-editor of more than 20 books in English and French as well as over 150 chapters and academic articles on security issues, urban violence, social inequality, and the discrimination young migrants suffered in the cities of Europe and America. Body-Gendrot also appeared on television programmes about urban questions.

== Personal life ==
She married the senior executive Alain Gendrot on 19 September 1970. They had two children. In 2005, Body-Gendrot was made a Chevalier of the Ordre des Palmes académiques and was appointed Chevalier of the Legion of Honour in 2012. She died in Paris, France on 21 September 2018.

== Works ==
Body-Gendrot promoted criminology, comparative criminology, and policing as areas of specialization at Sciences Po and advocated criminology when it was not an official scholarly discipline in France. Her works focused on empirically grounded analysis of situations in the United States, the United Kingdom and France, with occasional forays to Brazil, India or South Africa.
