= Thelma Eileen Jarrett =

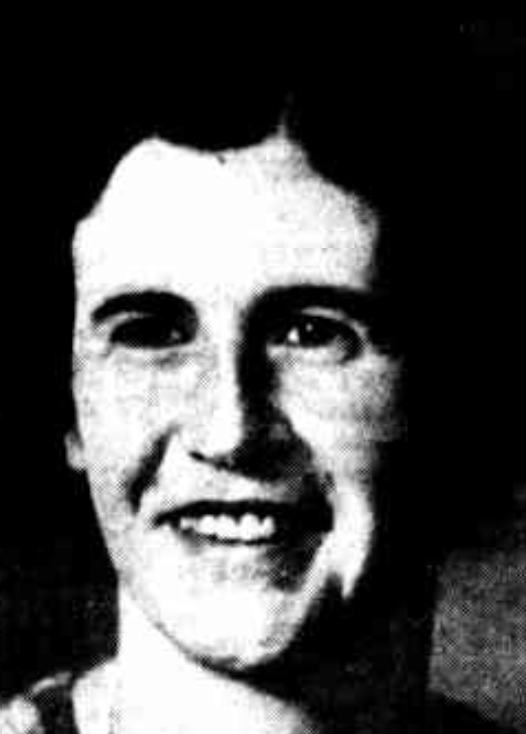
Thelma Eileen Jarrett, c. 1939.

Thelma Eileen Jarrett MBE (25 February 1905 – 13 August 1987) was an Australian Soroptimist. She was the first non-British person to become vice-president of the Federation of Soroptimist Clubs of Great Britain and Ireland, a position she held from 1969 to 1971, and from 1972 to 73, she was its president.

== Early life ==
Thelma Jarrett was born on 25 February 1905 in Gladesville, Sydney. Her father, Robert Loxton Jarrett, was an accountant; her mother was Elizabeth Hill. Jarrett attended Fintona Girls' School in Camberwell, Melbourne and had two stints as senior geography mistress at Tintern Ladies' College (1927–36; 1938–39). She studied geography at the London School of Economics and Political Science, graduating in 1937, before working at the public relations department of the Murray Valley Passenger Service. From 1940 to 1947, Jarrett worked as an assistant administrative superintendent for the Maribyrnong-based Munitions Supply Laboratories. She was later appointed as the general secretary of the Good Neighbour Council of Victoria, a post she held from 1952 to 1970. For her work as a councillor, she received the Order of the British Empire in 1957.

Jarrett joined Melbourne's Soroptimist Club in 1952 and sat on the board of governors of the Federation of Soroptimist Clubs of Great Britain and Ireland from 1960 to 1962, while she was based in London. She was also the representative of Victoria in the club's Australia-New Zealand coordinating committee. In 1964, she was elected to a two-year term as president of Victoria's divisional union; in 1969 she became the first non-British vice-president of the federation; and in 1972, she became its president. Especially concerned about underdeveloped nations, she was secretary and executive director of the Victorian branch of the United Nations Association of Australia (UNAA) from 1973 to 1974 and 1974 to 1975 respectively; she also served as honorary secretary of the Status of Women Committee at the UNAA from 1976 to 1984. Jarrett chaired the Business and Professional Women's Club in Melbourne from 1955 to 1957.

== Death ==
Jarrett died on 13 August 1987 in Hawthorn, Melbourne.
