= Mabel B. Dunn =

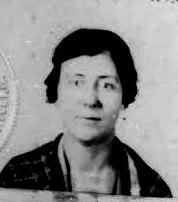
Mabel B. Dunn

Laura Mabel Blackstock Dunn (August 7, 1880 - April 9, 1968) was an American clubwoman.

== Early life ==
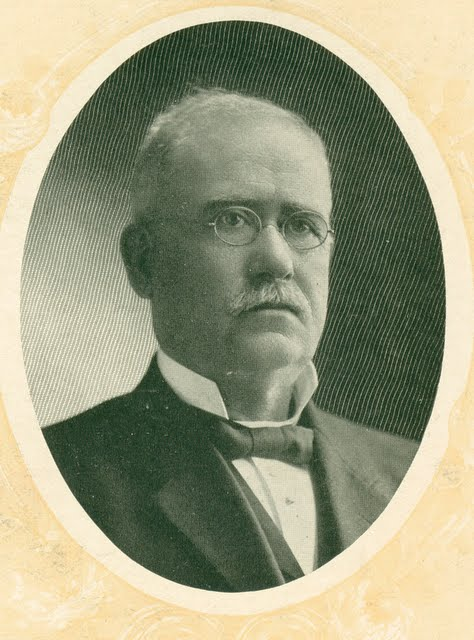
Judge Nehemiah Blackstock

Laura Mabel Blackstock was born in Ventura, California, on August 7, 1880, the daughter of Judge Nehemiah Blackstock (1846-1928) and Abigail "Abbie" Smith (1848-1930). Nehemiah practiced law there for about 30 years and in 1897 was appointed to the State Railroad Commission; in 1905 he was appointed State Banking Commissioner.

The family moved to Los Angeles in 1905.

== Career ==
Mabel B. Dunn was active in club affairs. She was the curator of the Shakespeare section of the Highland Park Ebell Club in Los Angeles. She was also a member of the Friday Morning Club and Kate Tupper Galpin Club.

== Personal life ==
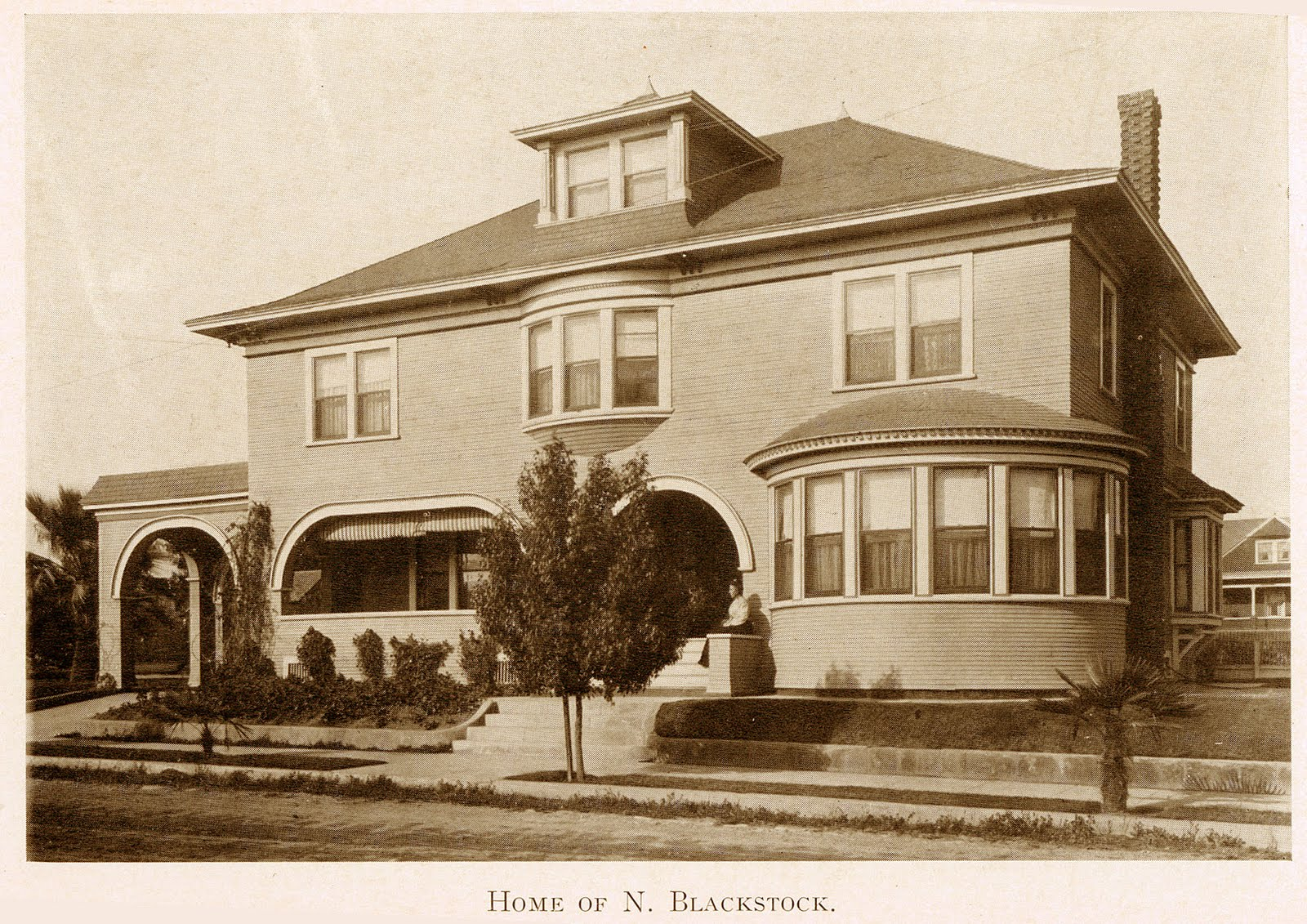
J. Nehemiah Blackstock House, 109 W. Avenue 54, Los Angeles (demolished), around the corner from Mabel Dunn's house

In 1906, Mabel Blackstock married Oliver Dunn, an early resident of the Oxnard area, and had two children: Oliver Charles Dunn (1909–1998) and Gerald/Gerold Camarillo Dunn (1911–1980). They first lived at Camarillo, California, and later moved to 5409 Pasadena Ave., Los Angeles, California

With the help of his father-in-law, Oliver Dunn became vice-president and trust officer of the Merchant Bank & Trust Co. of Los Angeles. In 1911 he opened his own company, the International Indemnity Company. He died in 1912 for blood disease.

She died on April 9, 1968, and is buried with her family at Forest Lawn Memorial Park (Glendale).
