= Françoise Moréchand =

French television personality in Japan

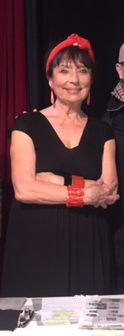
- Francoise Morechand in 2017.
- Born: Françoise Moréchand; March 29, 1936 (age 89); Paris, France
- Other names: フランソワーズ・モレシャン in Japanese
- Occupation(s): blogfashion, writer
- Years active: 1964-present
- Known for: Morechand Kimono, NHK TV appearances
- Spouse: Tatsuji Nagataki (m. 1974–present)
- Children: 1

Françoise Moréchand (born March 29, 1936) is a French TV personality in Japan and an author. Moréchand was one of the first foreigners to appear as foreign tarento on Japanese TV in 1964.

== Early life and education ==
Moréchand's father was an engineer at a steel factory and her mother was a French instructor at the École des Beaux-Arts. During World War II, the family moved from Paris to Toulouse. They returned to Paris just before the liberation of Paris in August 1944. After graduating from the Collège Sévigné in Japanese and Eastern Languages, Moréchand wanted to become a Chinese or Russian interpreter. Instead she went to Tokyo in 1958 with her first husband Guy Moréchand, an anthropologist. She is the mother of Agathe Moréchand.

Her father Jean Marie was an engineer diplomed from École Nationale des Arts et Métiers, promotion Paris 1914.

== Career ==
In 1964 for the Tokyo Olympics, she worked for NHK television. In 1974, Chanel entrusted her with the management of its cosmetics division in Japan. During this period of time, she met her current husband, Tatsuji Nagataki, an author and an authority on French culture and arts. Moréchand became a Japanese television star, a fashion specialist, an author, and a professor of comparative cultures at Kyoritsu University. She is a consultant and lecturer at the 21st Century Museum of Contemporary Art, Kanazawa.

She also works as an adviser for French Foreign Trade.

== Publications ==
As of 2019, Moréchand has authored 33 works, published variously in Japanese, French, and Chinese, which are held in 65 libraries internationally, including the National Diet Library, Harvard College Library, the New York Public Library System, the University of Chicago Library, and the Université Charles de Gaulle. Her most widely held book is La Gaïjine, and Le chic, c'est chic has sold over a million copies.

=== Selected books ===
- Moréchand, Françoise. 1976. Le chic, c'est chic.
- Moréchand, Françoise. 1978. Eregansutte nani.
- Moréchand, Françoise. 1984. Ii onna wa ryōri ga wakaru: Parijennu wa kuishinbō. Tōkyō: KK Besuto Serāzu
- Morechand, Francoise. 1987. Furansuryū kaji no tanoshimikata. Tōkyō: Besutoserāzu.
- Moréchand-Nagataki, Françoise, and Carol-Anne De Carolis. 1990. La Gaïjine. Paris: R. Laffont.
- Moréchand, Françoise. 1996. Moreshan no gekijo nikki.

== Awards ==
In 2009, Moréchand was awarded the Legion of Honour from France. In 2014, the French ambassador to Japan presented her with the insignia of Commander in the National Order of Merit, for "devoting herself for fifty years to communicate with the Japanese and the French in order to discover the riches of each of these cultures".
