= Ambrose Appelbe =

British solicitor and social reformer

Ambrose Erle Fuller Appelbe (1903 – 24 January 1999) was a British solicitor and social reformer.

Appelbe was born on a Trek Ox-wagon in the Kalahari Desert to a British family, his father being a medical missionary. He was educated at Kingswood School and Trinity Hall, Cambridge, where he was the Squire Law Scholar.

Appelbe settled at Toynbee Hall, and formed his own firm of solicitors. He also served on the council of the universities settlements, and on the executive of the Fabian Society.

In 1929, Appelbe married fellow solicitor Carrie Morrison. At the 1935 United Kingdom general election, he stood unsuccessfully for the Labour Party in Harwich. In 1958, he was a founding trustee of the Albany Trust.

Appelbe was, with George Bernard Shaw and H.G Wells, a founder of the Smell Society, which had the aim of promoting pleasant smells.
