= Pauline Suing Bloom =

American reporter and feature writer (1883–1940)

- Born: January 7, 1883; Council Bluffs, Iowa, U.S.
- Died: March 19, 1940 (aged 57)
- Resting place: Arlington National Cemetery, Arlington, Virginia, U.S.
- Occupations: Reporter; feature writer
- Spouse: Edward Jacob Bloom (died 1908)
- Children: 1
- Parent(s): Henry B. Suing; Teresa Paschel

Pauline Suing Bloom (January 7, 1883 – March 19, 1940) was an American reporter and feature writer, founder of The Spokane Woman.

== Early life ==
Pauline Suing Bloom was born in Council Bluffs, Iowa, on January 7, 1883, the daughter of Henry B. Suing and Teresa Paschel.

== Career ==
For years, Pauline Suing Bloom was a reporter and feature writer for Brooklyn Daily Eagle, New York.

She was the founder of The Spokane Woman, a weekly magazine published in Spokane, Washington and was its editor from 1926 to 1932.

She was a member of: Amethyst Club, Business and Professional Women's Club, Soroptimist Club, Women's Republican Club, Thursday Club, American Association of University Women.

== Personal life ==
Pauline Suing Bloom born lived in Nebraska and New York and then moved to Washington in 1905 and lived at W. 1225 Eleventh Avenue, Spokane, Washington.

She married Edward Jacob Bloom (born 1882 in Ohio), First Lieutenant of the United States Army, 4th U.S. Infantry, who died in the line of duty in 1908. Edward Jacob Bloom was the son of Jacob Emanuel Bloom (1851-1939) and Emma Cosgrove (1858-1924). Pauline Suing and Edward Bloom had one son, Edward J. Bloom (1908-1992), Lieutenant of United States Navy Reserve and then editor of The Spokane Woman.

She died on March 19, 1940, and is buried at Arlington National Cemetery with her parents-in-law, her husband and her son.
