= Teckla M. Carlson =

Teckla M. Carlson was a travel agent from Spokane and vice-president of the American Society of Travel Agents, Pacific Northwest.

== Early life ==
Teckla M. Broberg was born in Saint Paul, Minnesota, on August 14, 1893, the daughter of Werner Broberg (1862-1927) and Clara Marie Lundblad (1860-1936). Werner Broberg was born in Sweden, the son of Arnold Broberg and Matilda Gylling and came to the United States in 1882. On March 8, 1887, he married Clara Marie Lundblad, who immigrated in 1883, in Chicago. Teckla Broberg had 3 sisters: Georgia Broberg (born circa 1887), Bertha Broberg (born circa 1890), Lillie Broberg (born circa 1894).

The family moved to Spokane, Washington, in 1896.

== Career ==
Teckla Marie Carlson was the owner and manager of Werner-Broberg Travel Agency (Air, Steamer, Rail, Foreign, Domestic), Hyde Building, Spokane, established in 1898. She was the vice-president of the American Society of Travel Agents, Pacific Northwest. Carlson traveled several hundred miles to go to the ASTA meetings, and she had an attendance record, so that, the fact she missed a 1955 meeting was worth of notice.

Carlson was interested in civic affairs.

Carlson was a charter member of the Observers Club, and a member of the Spokane Soroptimist Club and the Advertising Club.

== Personal life ==
On December 15, 1917, Teckla Broberg married to George W. Carlson (1889-1941) and they had one son, Werner John (born April 7, 1922). Werner John Carlson enlisted in the U.S. Army in 1940, and served in the 8th Air Force during World War II; he was an educator in Orange County, California, and died on March 20, 2006.

Teckla Broberg later married Bonde Tuveson (1883-1954).

Carlson was a close friend, and possible lover, of Vladimir Fabry, a Slovak political refugee and U.S. legal adviser to the United Nations in the Congo, who died on 18 September 1961, in the same plane crash that killed also Swedish diplomat and the second Secretary-General of the United Nations Dag Hammarskjöld in Northern Rhodesia (1961 Ndola United Nations DC-6 crash). Fabry first met in 1949 at Geneva after he had succeeded in having his father Peter Palka released from a concentration camp.

Carlson lived at 1727 N. Atlantic, Spokane.

Carlson died in August 1964 and is buried at Greenwood Memorial Terrace, Spokane.
