= Collège Sévigné =

French non-denominational private school

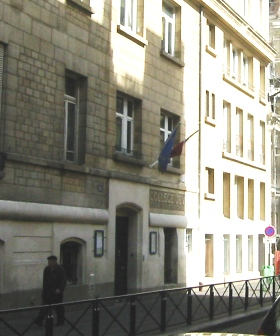
- Type: Private
- Established: 1880
- President: Yves Guerin
- Undergraduates: 1,400
- Location: Paris, 5th arrondissement, France; 48.834°N 2.334°E

The Collège Sévigné is a French non-denominational private school.

The school was founded in 1880 by Mathilde Salomon, becoming the first French non-denominational high school for young women, two months before the vote of the "Camille Sée" law establishing public secondary education for young women, and three years before the opening of the Lycée Fenelon. The founders, grouped in an association called "Société pour la propagation de l'instruction parmi les femmes", included Paul Bert (1833–1886), former Minister for Education, and a militant for Public Education. The school became co-educational in 1969.

Collège Sévigné was also the first school in France to open a kindergarten, in 1909.

Famous contributors to the education program at the school have been Alain, Gurvitch, Jankelevitch, Dumezil, Braudel, Mounier, Carcopino, Merleau-Ponty, Jacqueline de Romilly.

The school is only one of three non-denominational private schools in Paris.

The school is located on 28 Rue Pierre-Nicole in the 5th arrondissement.

Collège Sévigné offers classes from kindergarten to the Baccalaureat.

== Alumni ==
- Germaine Lubin
- Irène Joliot-Curie and Ève Curie, daughters of Pierre and Marie Curie, obtained their baccalaureat at the school
- Françoise Moréchand
- Sophie Body-Gendrot
- Thérèse Bertrand-Fontaine
