= Oda Faulconer =

American judge

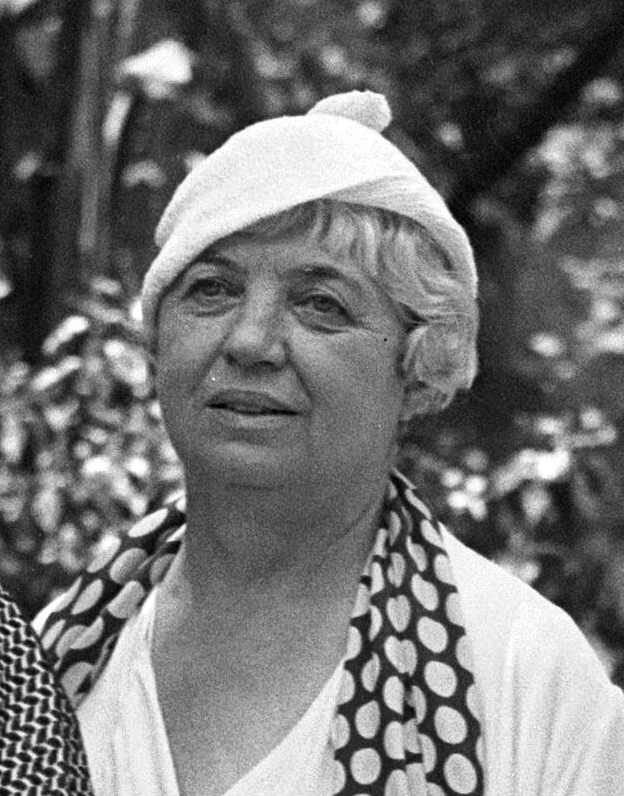
Oda Faulconer, 1935

Oda Hunt Faulconer (November 10, 1884 - November 3, 1943) was an early 20th century lawyer and judge and the president of the Bank of Italy, San Fernando, and West Adams State Bank, Los Angeles.

== Early life ==
Oda Faulconer was born in Springfield, Illinois on November 10, 1884, the daughter of August and Mary E. Hunt.

Faulconer graduated from the University of Southern California Law School and was admitted to the Bar of Los Angeles in 1913.

== Career ==
Oda Faulconer was an attorney-at-Law with a private practice at 1203 Loew State Building, Los Angeles. She was admitted to practice in all state and Federal Courts of California and the Supreme Court of United States on October 17, 1919, and later became a judge in August 1931.

In 1926 Faulconer was the first vice-president of the San Fernando Valley Bar Association.

The Women Lawyers Association of Los Angeles was born by the merging of two women's bar organizations: the Women Lawyers' Club, founded in 1918, and the Women Lawyers' Association of Southern California, founded in 1928. The president of the Women Lawyers' Association of Southern California was Mab Copeland Lineman, who was also the 4th President of the Women Lawyers' Club, while Faulconer was the secretary-treasurer. In 1930, when the Association reorganized into the Southern California Council of the National Association of Women Lawyers, Ida May Adams was president and Faulconer vice-president. Faulconer was elected president for two terms, in 1938 and 1939.

As a Judge, Faulconer often presided the Los Angeles night court; for this reason she was assisting during the filming of Midnight Court with Ann Dvorak.

Faulconer was: State Chairman of American Citizenship of the California Federation of Women's Clubs; Vice-president of the San Fernando Valley Bar Association; City Mother under the supervision of the Official City Mothers' Bureau of the City of Los Angeles; President of San Fernando Women's Club; President of the Soroptimist Club.

Faulconer was Director in Bank of Italy, San Fernando, also in West Adams State Bank, Los Angeles.

Faulconer owned and managed a 35-acres citrus ranch in San Fernando Valley.

Faulconer was a member of: State Bar Association, Los Angeles Bar Association, American Bar Association, Business and Professional Woman's Club, Friday Morning Club, Republican County Central Committee, Executive Committee of Republican State Central Committee.

== Personal life ==
A former resident of Portland, Oregon, Oda Faulconer moved to Los Angeles in 1902 and lived at 16603 Mission Blvd. (later 16325, and now demolished), San Fernando, Los Angeles, California.

Faulconer adopted her nephew, Marvin L. Huron (born January 4, 1921, Los Angeles County, California), the son of Leban Huron (1885 - 1923) and Leta Irene Hunt (born February 22, 1887, Portland, Multnomah, Oregon).

Faulconer died on November 3, 1943, and is buried at Forest Lawn Memorial Park (Glendale), Plot: Sanct. of Gratitude, GM, Memorial Terrace, Lot 0, Space 5946.
