= Mary Sykes =

British solicitor, politician and magistrate (1896–1981)

- Born: 24 August 1896; Honley, West Yorkshire, England
- Died: 25 February 1981 (aged 84); Worfield, Shropshire, England
- Other name: Mary Browne
- Education: Royal Holloway College; University of Leeds
- Occupations: Solicitor, Local councillor, Alderman, Mayor, Magistrate
- Employer(s): Armitage, Sykes and Hinchcliffe; Mary E Sykes & Co.
- Spouse: Richard Harry Browne
- Parent(s): James Sykes & Emma Amelia Turner
- Relatives: Eric Turner Sykes & Philip James Sykes (brothers)

Mary Elaine Sykes (24 August 1896 – 25 February 1981) was a British solicitor, politician and magistrate. She was one of the first women solicitors in England and Wales. She read English at Royal Holloway College (1914–1917) and law at the University of Leeds (1918–1919). She obtained a BA and LL.B both from the University of London.

Having been articled to her father, a partner in his own firm of solicitors in Huddersfield (Armitage, Sykes and Hinchcliffe), in November 1922, along with Mary Pickup, Carrie Morrison, and Maud Crofts, she was one of the first women to sit the Law Society’s Final Examination, the first time the examination was opened to women following the passing of the Sex Disqualification (Removal) Act 1919. Morrison was the first of them to finish her articles, and was the first woman admitted to the role of solicitor. Sykes was admitted as a solicitor in 1923. She worked for her father’s firm until 1930, when she set up her own firm, Mary E Sykes & Co. She remained in practice as a solicitor until 1968. In 1980 Mary E Sykes & Co merged with Ramsdens Solicitors. Sykes was elected president of the Huddersfield Law Society in 1951 and in 1955 was appointed as a magistrate.

In 1935 she was elected as a Labour councillor on the Huddersfield Borough Council. In 1938 she became Huddersfield’s first woman alderman, and in 1945 she became the first woman to be elected as Mayor of Huddersfield. She was a member of the Labour Party and served as President of the Huddersfield Labour Party.

She was a founder member of the Huddersfield branch of the British Federation of Women Graduates, and a member of the Women’s Luncheon Club, the Business and Professional Women's Club, and the Huddersfield Soroptimist Club.

She was friends with the renowned naturalist Phyllis Kelway. She married Richard Harry Browne in 1953.
