= Carrie Morrison =

English solicitor (1888–1950)

- Born: 3 February 1888; Richmond, Surrey, England
- Died: 20 February 1950 (aged 62); Broxbourne, Herefordshire, England
- Education: Manchester High School for Girls
- Alma mater: Girton College, Cambridge (not allowed to graduate as a woman)
- Occupation: solicitor
- Known for: in 1922 one of the first women lawyers in England

Carol Morrison (3 February 1888 – 20 February 1950) was the first woman to be admitted as a solicitor in England.

== Biography ==
Morrison was born in Richmond, Surrey to father Thomas Morrison (1834–1901), son of a Scottish innkeeper who worked as a copper and metal broker in Spain and elsewhere, a wealthy company director, and mother Judith Wakefield Morrison (1856 – 1924), from Lincolnshire, from an illiterate labourer's family. Due to her father's work involving travel, Morrison's early education to the age of 15 was in four different countries, at five schools before she studied at Manchester High School for Girls from 1904 to 1907, and awarded an exhibition.

Morrison went on to graduate in 1910, again with an exhibition, from Girton College, Cambridge with First Class Honours in Modern and Medieval Languages Tripos, but she was not allowed a degree because she was a woman.

Morrison languages career was then trying teaching at schools in Penarth, Wales and East Putney, London, then working for MI5 eventually in Constantinople, attached to the Army of the Black Sea, in 1919. Through a contact there, Alfred Baker, Morrison was taken on as clerk and then after the Sex Disqualification (Removal) Act 1919, permitted women to train as solicitors, after the First World War, when attitudes to women and work began to change, and there were 3000 fewer (all male) solicitors than when the war began. Baker sponsored her to take her articles.

On qualification as one of the first female solicitors, in 1922, Morrison was interviewed by the Dundee Evening Telegraph (31 October 1922) saying ' Men say the law is too rough and tumble for women, but I have had that in the Permit Office' and also complaining that the cost of qualifying was a more significant barrier to women.

== Legal career ==
In 1922 she and Mary Pickup, Mary Sykes, and Maud Crofts became the first women in England to qualify as solicitors; Morrison was the first of them to finish her articles, and was the first woman admitted to the role of solicitor, at the Supreme Court of England. Morrison worked as a 'Poor Man's Lawyer', providing pro bono or low fee services to people in London's East End, at Toynbee Hall.

In 1927, she married fellow solicitor Ambrose Appelbe, who was 15 years her junior, but shared her socialist views. Their non-conformist views led them to be 'watched' by MI5, during the 1930s. Her husband went on to found a firm in London that is now part of BDB Pitmans. Morrison refused to use her married name and petitioned court officials to be refer in court records, to her profession not her marital status.

Morrison was said to 'set high standard of determination and dedication to her profession for the women who came after her.' Morrison took on cases which were considered socially challenging, such as acting for prostitutes in court, acted for the Women and Children's' Protection Society and the Becontree Estate protesters in 1932. Keen to see reform of divorce laws, she had a modern attitude to gender equality, and was not supportive of women taking advantage of their husbands nor of men who mistreated their wives. She was said to have taken steps 'to shield her 17-year-old male articled clerk from the details of the more brutal and salacious cases that she dealt with.' The Daily Telegraph (26 May 1928) reported the judge Lord Meredith remarked on unusual situation of a divorce decree nisi female petitioner being represented by a woman. Morrison was the first woman to be invited to speak at the Law Society's Annual Provincial Meeting in 1931, and spoke on the benefit of dispute resolution and "Courts of Domestic Relations."

In another well reported divorce case, Blackwell v Blackwell [1943] 2 All ER 579, Morrison unsuccessfully defended a wife whose husband was claiming her dividends from shopping at the Co-operative Society should belong to him. MP Robert Boothby commented on the case that 'if wives were permitted to save money from the housekeeping for their own purposes they would not feed their husbands properly.'

On an official form question about 'suffering from any physical disability?' Morrison put 'No, except being a woman'. Although they later divorced, Morrison, unconventionally, continued to work with her ex-husband Applebe professionally, and both were actively involved in the Married Woman's Association.

Morrison worked until her death in Broxbourne, Hertford, age 62. Her obituary in the local press Herefordshire Mercury, praised 'the generosity and compassion of a complex and at times gruff and eccentric woman'. The 1919 Club for women solicitors, (succeeded by the Association of Women Solicitors) of which she was a founder member kept a minute's silence when her death was announced. Morrison is considered a 'trailblazer' in the first century of female lawyers.

She was also a Soroptimist.

== Legacy ==
By 1967, 2.7% of solicitors in England were women, by 1997 32% and by the centenary of Morrison's admission to the profession over 52% of qualified solicitors are women.

In 1999, Lady Hale became the first female Law Lord, and in 2009 became the first woman to be a Justice of the Supreme Court. Lady Hale became President of the Supreme Court in 2017, stepping down on 10 January 2020.

== See also ==
- List of first women lawyers by nationality
- The first 100 years of women in the legal profession https://first100years.org.uk/about-us/history/
- Blog on removal of Sex Disqualification 2020 https://www.lawsociety.org.uk/topics/blogs/sex-disqualification-removal-act-1919-where-are-we-now
- Article on legal profession opening to women https://www.lawgazette.co.uk/law/it-was-100-years-ago-today-profession-marks-opening-to-women/5102587.article
