= Eleanor Addison Phillips =

British educationist, founder of UK's first Soroptimist movement

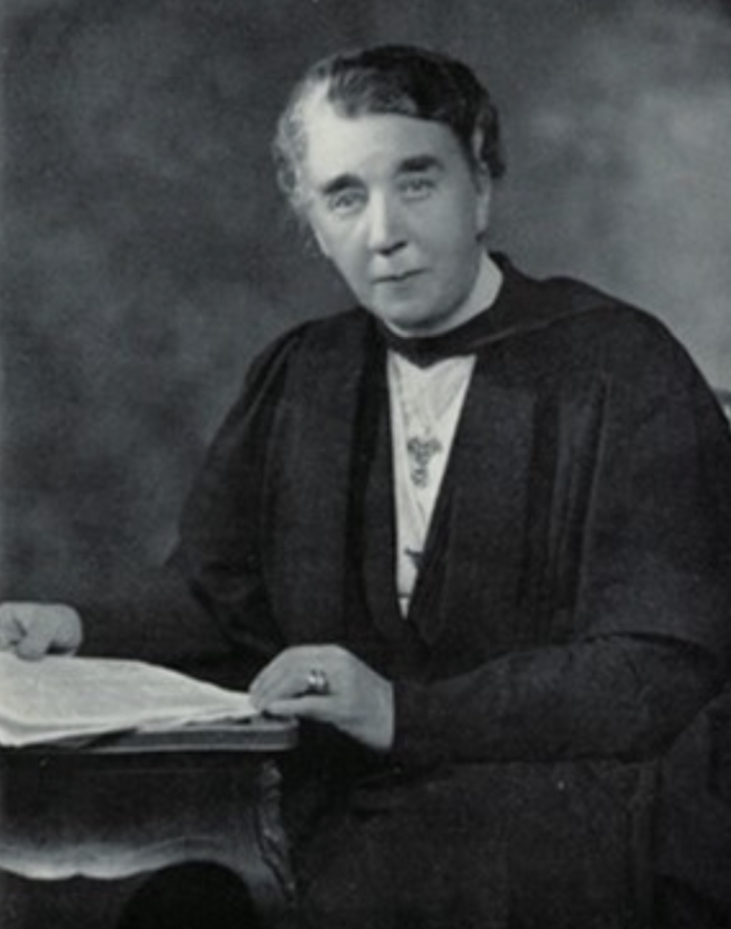
- Phillips in 1919

Headmistress of Clifton High School
- In office 1908–1933
- Preceded by: Catherine Burns
- Succeeded by: D. Nonita Glenday

Personal details
- Born: 2 December 1874 Paddington, London, England
- Died: 25 June 1952 (aged 77) Kensington, London, England
- Parents: Francis Phillips; Mary Addison
- Education: St Hugh's College, Oxford
- Known for: Founder and first president of first UK Soroptimist club

Eleanor Addison Phillips (2 December 1874 – 25 June 1952) was an English educationist and founder of the first UK Soroptimist movement, the Venture Club. She was also headmistress of Clifton High School in Bristol.

== Early life and career ==
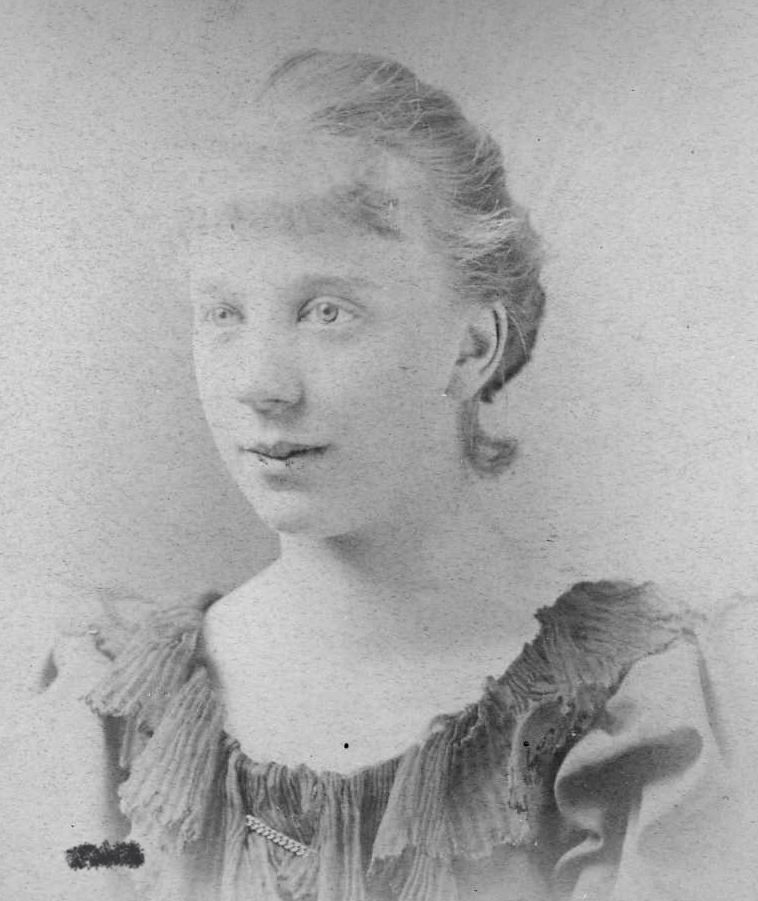
Phillips as a young girl

Eleanor Addison Phillips was born on 2 December 1874, in Paddington, London, to Francis Phillips (1838–1925) and Mary Addison (1843–1906). She was the third child to a family of nine. She was born into a wealthy family; according to the 1881 census, the family had five servants.

She attended Maida Vale High School and then went to St Mary's College, Paddington (today Imperial College School of Medicine) to qualify as a teacher, later becoming a lecturer and head of the training department.

In 1905, aged 30, she went to St Hugh's College, Oxford to study modern history; her teachers included Ernest Barker, A.L. Smith, and H.W.C. Davis.

== Headmistress at Clifton High School ==
In 1908, while Phillips was at Oxford, on suggestion by Eleanor Jourdain, Phillips applied for the headmistress position at Clifton High School, which she received, holding the position until 1933.

She took over as headmistress in September 1908. She initially resided at 1 Clifton Park Road until the beginning of the 1920s, when it was sold to fund construction of a new school wing. She also purchased the houses on the school green and rented 1 Cecil Road as a boarding house. In 1929, after renovations to the main hall, the play Henry VIII was performed on the inaugurating night.

During her time as headmistress, Clifton High School was expanded, student numbers doubled, and over 60% of students got accepted at universities. In 1910, she organised the school's first Christmas concert, with Hubert Hunt, a tradition continued today. In 1925, she helped found an 'old girls' (Clifton High School alumni) branch in London. She left in 1933. Her impact on the school led to the creation of the Eleanor Addison Phillips prize. Upon leaving, she appointed Ms Dorothea Nonita Glenday as her successor.

From 1929 to 1931, she was president of the Association of Head Mistresses.

=== Gallery ===
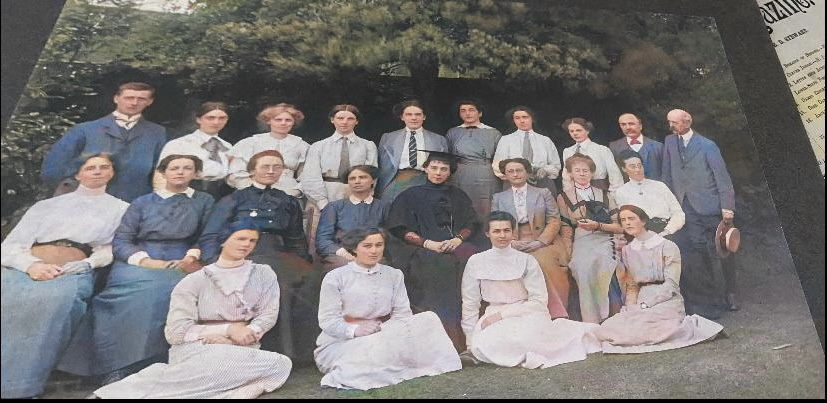
CHS staff in 1913; Ms Phillips in centre

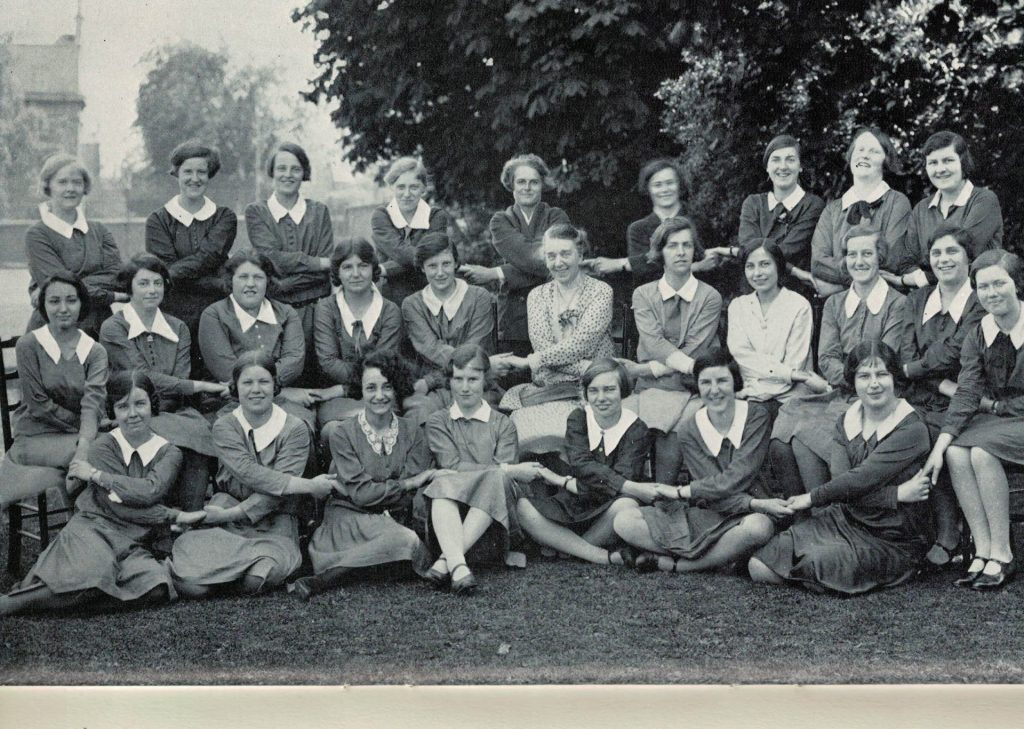
Phillips and CHS students

== Soroptimist movement ==
Phillips played a key part in the development of the UK Soroptimist movement, being the founder and first president of the first club, the Venture Club. This was founded on 10 May 1920 at Bristol's Royal Hotel, located at College Green (today the Marriott Royal Hotel), and Phillips was unanimously elected president. In 1928, the first Venture Club and six other Venture Clubs united to form the Association of Venture Clubs. Two years later, after Soroptimist International heard of the Venture Club, and their shared goals, they merged, and Phillips was elected as Vice President of Britain's national Union of Soroptimists, a position she held until 1933. She was also a key member of the Soroptimist council board.

In June 1933, at the National Union Conference of the Soroptimists in Bristol, and on her retirement, Phillips was appointed an Honorary Member of all Soroptimist Clubs “in recognition of her outstanding services”. She is the only Soroptimist member to date to achieve this title. In July 1933, the Soroptimist branch of Bristol gave Phillips a pendant bearing the initials ‘V’ and ‘S’. She was also given jewels spelling out the name ‘Soroptimist’, by the first letter of the jewels: Sapphire, Opal, Ruby, Onyx, Pearl, Tourmaline, Iolites, Moonstone, Iolites, Sapphire and Topaz. She gave the pendant back, and it is worn by the Immediate Past President of the Soroptimist movement in Bristol.

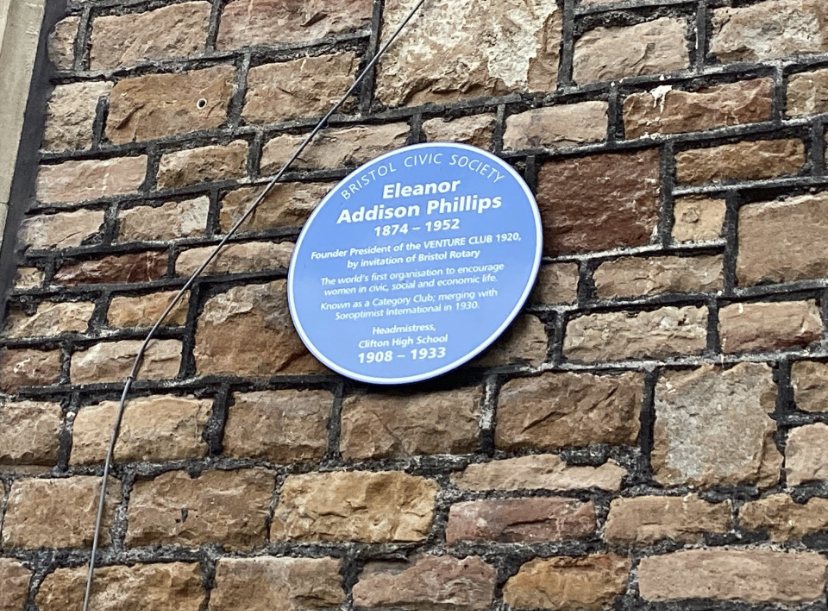
Eleanor Addison Phillips Plaque

To honour her work and dedication to the Soroptimist Movement, and the Venture Club, a plaque was unveiled on 10 May 2020, 100 years since the founding of the Venture club, by the President of the Soroptimist International branch in Bristol. The plaque is located at Clifton High School.

== Later life, death ==
After Phillips's retirement in 1933, she remained in Bristol until 1941, before moving to Oxford until 1945. She then lived with her sisters in London, until her death in 1952. She never married and had no children, but was an aunt; her brother (Francis Addison Phillips (1872-1902)) had a son, Francis Hugh Addison Phillips (1901-1980), who married Barbara Holmes (daughter of civil servant Maurice Gerald Holmes) in 1946. Phillips died on 25 June 1952, and was buried in Kensington, London.

A photographic portrait of Phillips by James Lafayette is held in the National Portrait Gallery, London.
