= Friday Morning Club =

- U.S. National Register of Historic Places
- Los Angeles Historic-Cultural Monument
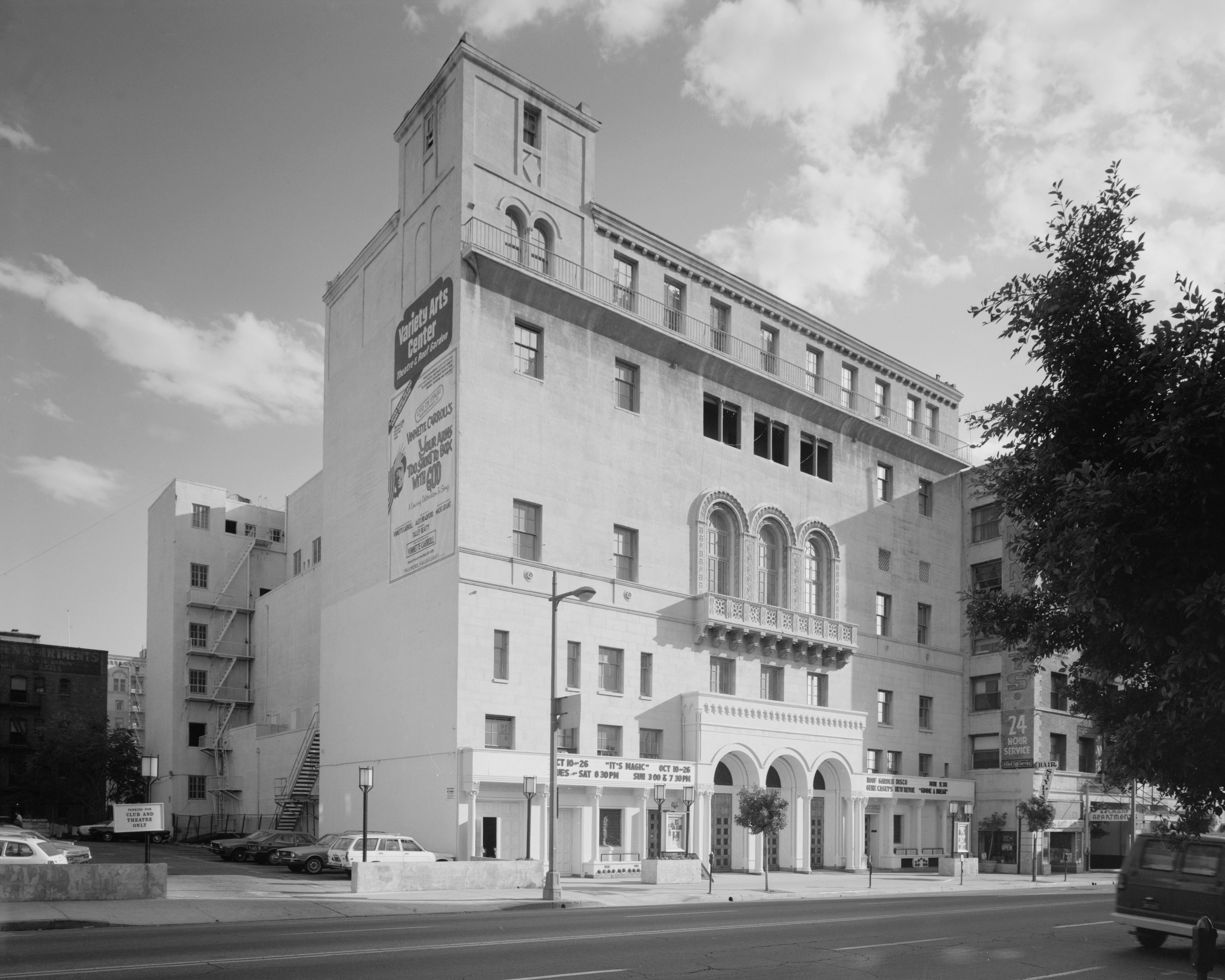
- Friday Morning Club, in 1980.
- Location: 940 South Figueroa Street; Los Angeles, California
- Coordinates: 34.0454°N 118.2632°W
- Built: 1923
- Architect: Allison & Allison
- Architectural style: Italian Renaissance Revival
- NRHP reference No.: 84000865
- LAHCM No.: 196
- Added to NRHP: May 17, 1984

The Friday Morning Club building is located in Downtown Los Angeles, California. It was the second home of the women's club also named the Friday Morning Club (FMC), for 61 years.

The large and elaborate six−story clubhouse was designed by architects Allison & Allison in an Italian Renaissance Revival style, and built in 1923.

== Club history ==
The club was founded by abolitionist, suffragist, mother, and Los Angeles homemaker Caroline Severance in 1891, with 87 other women in the reading room of the Hollenbeck Hotel, then located at Second and Broadway. The Friday Morning Club became the largest women's club in California, with membership of over 1,800 women by the 1920s.

Women's clubs were a mainstay of middle-class women's social and intellectual life across America from the end of the Civil War until the middle of the 20th century, when their numbers declined as opportunities increased for women's equal participation in mainstream business, educational, and social institutions.

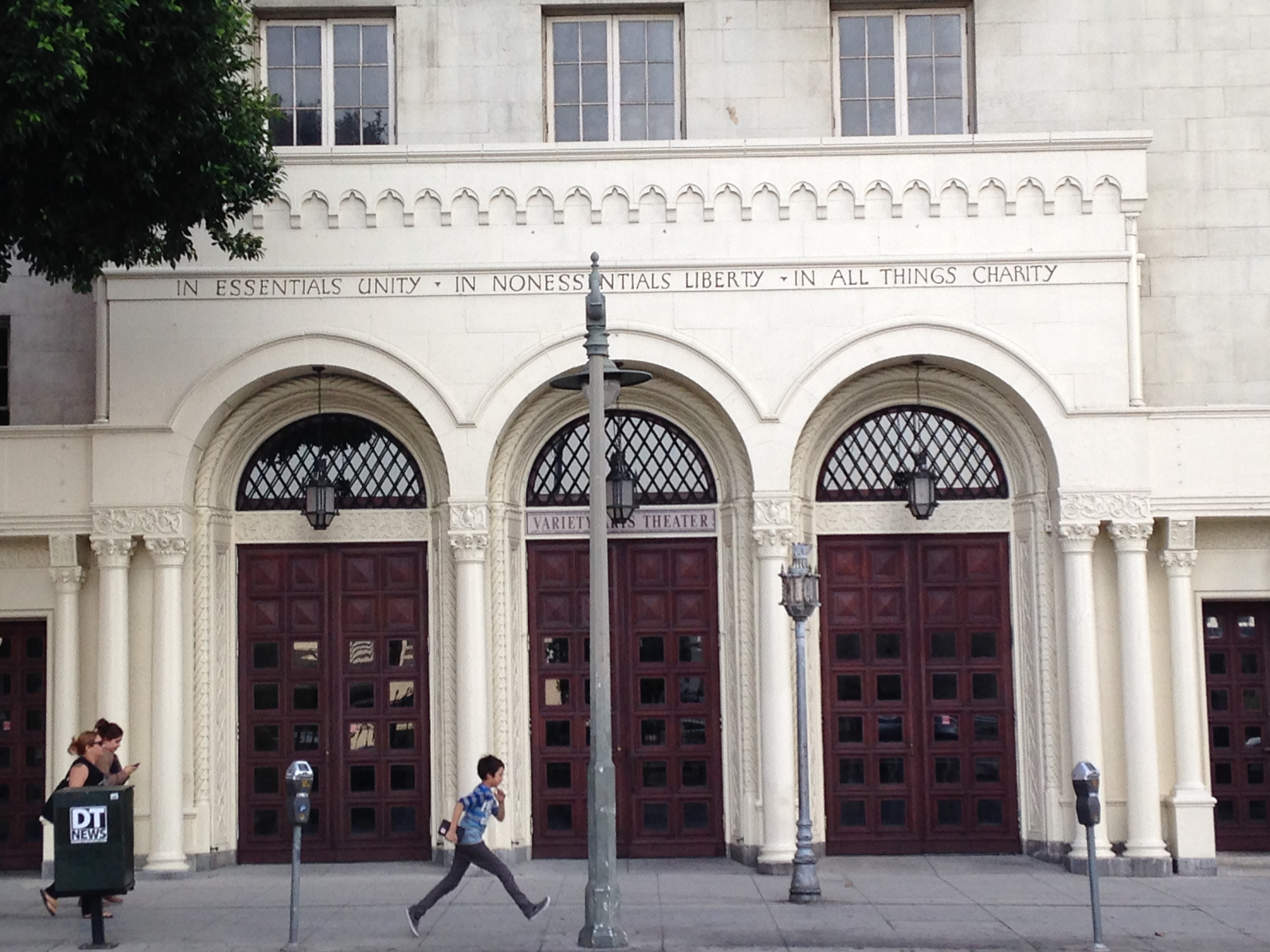
The theatre in April 2014.

Caroline Severance had founded one of the first such clubs in the nation, the New England Women's Club of Boston in 1868. Her known political associations gave the FMC a (deserved) reputation as a politically active powerhouse for community improvement in Los Angeles. To meet their goals of self-improvement, study of the arts, literature and culture and the political and social advancement of women, the women's clubs built or renovated a building to serve as their club house as soon as they could raise the funds. To protect the club and its assets in an era of less-than-solid property rights for married women, clubs routinely formed a stock corporation to raise and invest money for a clubhouse campaign, and usually recruited an unmarried member to serve as secretary or treasurer of the club's finances.

== Clubhouse history ==
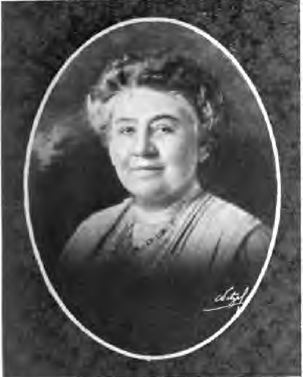
Mrs. Andrew Stewart Lobingier, 1922 President of the Friday Morning Club, Who's Who Among the Women of California

The FMC's first clubhouse was at the same location, and was a Mission Revival-style two-story building that cost $25,000 to build in 1900.

When World War I increased their membership far beyond the capacity of that building, the Friday Morning Club dismantled it, sold it with its furnishings to the Catholic Woman's Club, and built the current six-story Italian Renaissance Revival-style structure on its site in 1923. Its two auditoriums and seating for nearly 2,000 made it suitable to the Friday Morning Club's popular arts and theater programs in the 1920s and 1930s.

The Figueroa Hotel was built directly across the street from the Friday Morning Club in 1925. It was also financed and managed by women, to meet the needs of business, professional, and traveling women in Los Angeles. The two are a microcosm of the increasingly important and complex roles women were playing in American society in the 1920s.

=== Society for the Preservation of Variety Arts ===
The club sold the building's title in 1977 to the Society for the Preservation of Variety Arts, who used the Variety Arts Theater auditorium for live plays, cabarets, meals and revivals of early stage and radio dramas, and for filming and special events rentals. The Society also displayed extensive collections in the field of theater arts in the building. The SPVA Library is open as a research facility to serious students of the theater arts.

The Friday Morning Club's members continued to meet and serve the community, from the leased-back 5th floor and later rented quarters on Wilshire Boulevard, until the 1990s. Today, the Ebell of Los Angeles is the largest functioning woman's club in the city, with approximately 400 members and a large 1927 clubhouse in the Hancock Park district.

The building was sold to AEG in 2004, then subsequently sold to property developer David Houk in 2007. In October 2015, Hillsong Church Los Angeles announced that they had signed a 15-year lease on the property, with two five-year extension options, and will use the building for church services and offices. After extensive renovations, Hillsong LA expects to move into the building in early 2017.

=== Landmark ===
The Friday Morning Club building is a Los Angeles Historic-Cultural Monument. It was added to the National Register of Historic Places in 1984, meeting the criteria for both social history and architectural significance.

== Notable members ==
- Lillie Stella Acer Ballagh
- Mabel B. Dunn
- Nannie C. Dunsmoor
- Oda Faulconer
- Mary Simons Gibson
- Georgia Thatcher Kemp
- Sarah Bixby Smith (also served as president)
- Marion Foster Washburne

== See also ==
- List of Los Angeles Historic-Cultural Monuments in Downtown Los Angeles
- National Register of Historic Places listings in Los Angeles, California
