= Lillie Stella Acer Ballagh =

Founder of Matinee Musical Club

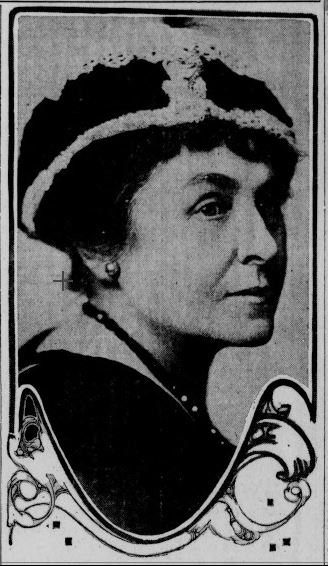
Lillie Stella Acer Ballagh

Lillian "Lillie" Stella Acer Ballagh Farmer (died April 30, 1938) was the founder of Matinee Musical Club, Los Angeles.

== Early life ==
Lillian "Lillie" Stella Acer was born October 30, in Rochester, New York, the daughter of John Acer and Maria Foster.

== Career ==
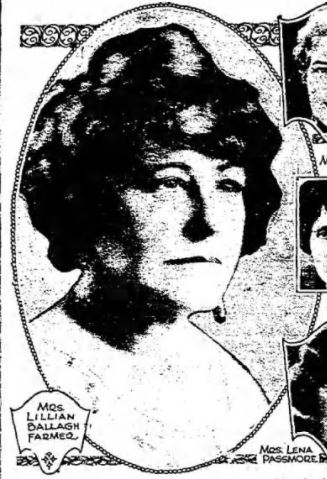
Lillian Ballagh Farmer

Before moving to Southern California, Ballagh was for three consecutive years the president of the Schumann Club in Chicago.

Ballagh was the founder of Matinee Musical Club in 1908. She aspired to an unbroken record of paying for services of artists appearing on the club's program. Matinee Musical adhered to its original aim and was the first club of the kind in Los Angeles to take that stand. In that way, musicians were encouraged and music was advanced in the community.

She was the national chairman of Colonial Relics of the Daughters of the American Revolution.

A wealthy widow in May 1925, Ballagh engaged further in the real estate operations of her late husband with success.

She was a member of the Friday Morning Club, the Ebell of Los Angeles, the Wa-Wan Club, the Colonial Dames of America and Southern California Woman's Press Club.

== Personal life ==
Ballagh moved to California in 1907. She had a summer home at Palisades, State Highway, Santa Monica, California and a winter home at 308 N. Louise St., Glendale, California. She also had a country home, Ballagh Lodge, on Malibu Road.

Lillie Stella Acer married James Henry Ballagh (1851-1925) on April 25, 1883, in Ontario. Ballagh was a pioneer real estate operator. They had two children: Roy Acer and James Courtenay (1889-1966).

She was a widow in 1925 and, on June 26, 1929, she married a second time to Frank Edward Farmer of San Diego, executive of the Bell-Lloyd Corporation. She died on April 30, 1938, and is buried at Forest Lawn Memorial Park (Glendale).
