= State Bar of Georgia =

Bar Association

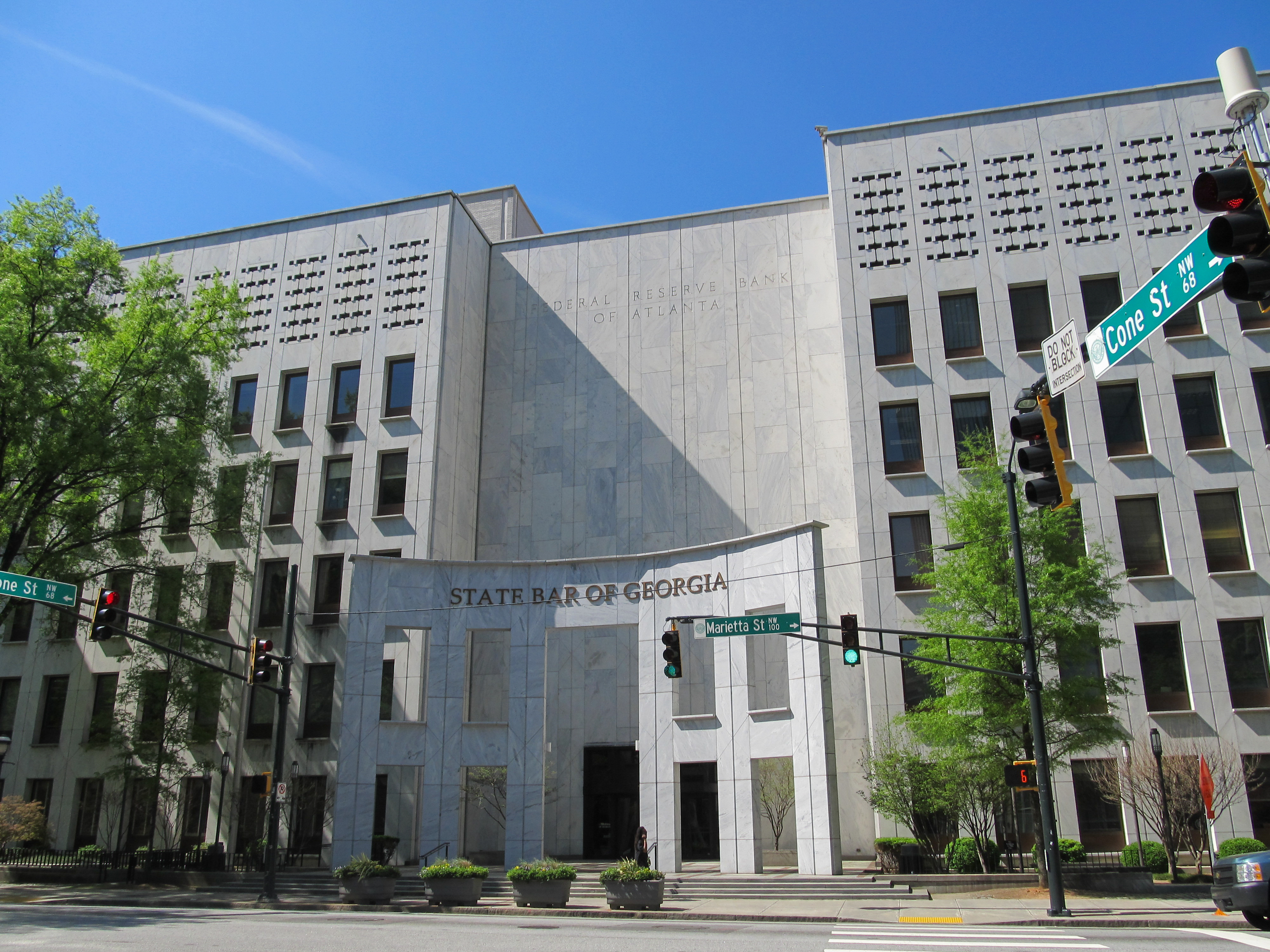
- State Bar of Georgia headquarters.
- Type: Legal society
- Headquarters: Atlanta, Georgia
- Location: United States
- Website: gabar.org

The State Bar of Georgia is the governing body of the legal profession in the State of Georgia, operating under the supervision of the Supreme Court of Georgia. Membership is a condition of admission to practice law in Georgia.

The State Bar was established in 1964 as the successor of the prior voluntary Georgia Bar Association which was founded in 1884. The stated purpose of the State Bar of Georgia is to foster among the members of the Bar of this state the principles of duty and service to the public; to improve the administration of justice; and to advance the science of law.

The Bar's codes of ethics and discipline are enforced by the Supreme Court of Georgia through the State Bar's Office of the General Counsel.

== Membership ==
By order of the Supreme Court of Georgia (219 GA 873 and subsequent amendments), one is required before engaging in the practice of law to register with the State Bar and to pay the prescribed dues.

Following are statistics regarding State Bar of Georgia members as of March 2, 2015:

- Active members in good standing: 37,031
- Inactive members in good standing: 8,562
- Emeritus members: 1,645
- Affiliate members: 20
- Student members: 148
- Foreign law consultants: 7
- Overall Membership: 47,143

== Programs ==
The Bar offers a variety of programs:

- BASICS
- Committee to Promote Inclusion in the Profession
- Consumer Assistance Program
- Continuing Legal Education
- Cornerstones of Freedom Program
- Fee Arbitration
- Georgia Diversity Program
- Judicial District Professionalism Program
- Law-Related Education
- Law Practice Management Program
- Lawyer Assistance Program
- Legislative Program
- Military Legal Assistance Program
- Pro Bono Resource Center
- SOLACE Program
- Transition Into Law Practice Program
- Unlicensed Practice of Law
- Young Lawyers Division

== Ethics ==
Georgia lawyers are bound by strict rules of ethics in all of their professional dealings. The Georgia Rules of Professional Conduct help define a lawyer's obligations to clients, to the judicial system, and to the public.

Although the Supreme Court of Georgia retains ultimate authority to regulate the legal profession, the State Bar of Georgia's Office of the General Counsel serves as the Court's arm to investigate and prosecute claims that a lawyer has violated the ethics rules.

The Rules of Professional Conduct are found at Part IV, Chapter 1 of the Bar Rules. Part IV, Chapter 2 contains the procedural rules for disciplinary actions against lawyers. In addition to the Rules, the Bar and the Supreme Court periodically have issued Formal Advisory Opinions that clarify a lawyer's obligations in certain situations. A complete list of Formal Advisory Opinions follows Part IV, Chapter 3 of the Bar Rules.

Lawyers who would like to discuss an ethics dilemma with a member of the Office of the General Counsel staff should contact the Lawyer Helpline at 404-527-8720 or 800-334-6865. Members of the public who believe that a Georgia lawyer has violated the rules of ethics should contact the Bar's Consumer Assistance Program at 800-334-6865.

== Sections ==
Forty-five sections provide service to the legal profession and public. A conduit for information in particular areas of law, sections provide newsletters, programs and the chance to exchange ideas with other practitioners. The sections include:

- Administrative Law
- Agriculture Law
- Animal Law
- Antitrust Law
- Appellate Practice
- Aviation Law
- Bankruptcy Law
- Business Law
- Child Protection & Advocacy
- Constitutional Law
- Consumer Law
- Corporate Counsel Law
- Creditors' Rights
- Criminal Law
- Dispute Resolution
- E-Discovery and the Use of Technology
- Elder Law
- Eminent Domain
- Employee Benefits Law
- Entertainment & Sports Law
- Environmental Law
- Equine Law
- Family Law
- Fiduciary Law
- Franchise & Distribution Law
- General Practice & Trial Law
- Government Attorneys
- Health Law
- Immigration Law
- Individual Rights Law
- Intellectual Property Law
- International Law
- Judicial
- Labor & Employment Law
- Law & Economics
- Legal Economics Law
- Local Government Law
- Military/Veterans Law
- Nonprofit Law
- Product Liability Law
- Professional Liability
- Real Property Law
- School & College Law
- Senior Lawyers
- Taxation Law
- Technology Law
- Tort & Insurance Practice
- Workers' Compensation Law

== Leadership ==
Day-to-day operations of the State Bar of Georgia are directed by an executive director.

The State Bar of Georgia officers include a president, president-elect, treasurer, secretary, immediate past president, Young Lawyers Division (YLD) president, YLD president-elect and YLD immediate past president.

The board of governors is the 160-member policy-making authority of the State Bar, with representation from each of Georgia's judicial circuits. The board holds regular meetings five times per year. It elects six of its members to serving on the executive committee with the organization's officers. The executive committee meets monthly and exercises the power of the board of governors when the board is not in session.

== Offices ==
The State Bar of Georgia has three offices: in Atlanta, Savannah and Tifton.

The headquarters of State Bar of Georgia, known as the Bar Center, is located at 104 Marietta Street NW, Atlanta, GA 30303. Phone 404-527-8700.

The South Georgia Office is located at 244 E. Second Street, Tifton, GA 31793. Phone 229-387-0446.

The Coastal Georgia Office is located at 7402 Hodgson Memorial Dr #105, Savannah, GA 31406. Phone 912-239-9910.

=== Headquarters building ===
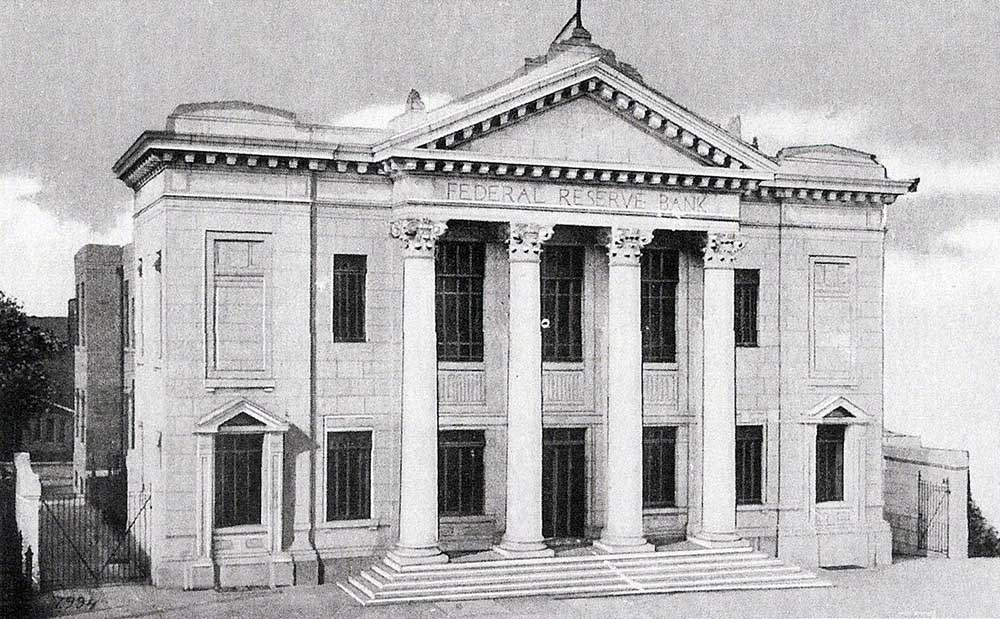
Federal Reserve Bank of Atlanta, original 1918 building

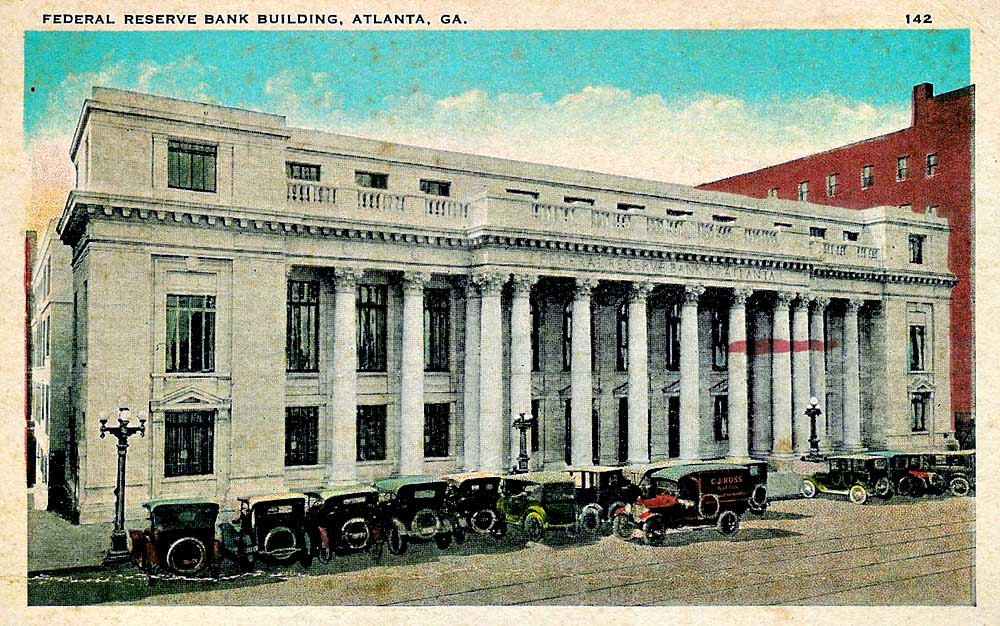
Federal Reserve Bank of Atlanta after expansion in 1920 and possibly after additional expansion in 1922

The headquarters building was originally the Federal Reserve Bank of Atlanta which opened in 1918.

== Young Lawyers Division ==
All newly admitted members of the State Bar automatically become members of the Young Lawyers Division (YLD). Membership in the YLD terminates at the end of the fiscal year after (1) the lawyer's 36th birthday or (2) the fifth anniversary of the lawyer's first admission to practice, whichever is later.

It has had guidance over the years from the State Bar of Georgia, its Executive Committee and Board of Directors, the Supreme Court. In keeping with its motto of "working for the profession and the public," the YLD has 27 committees that provide service to the public, the profession, and the Bar through an array of projects and programs. The YLD has also gained national recognition by winning several American Bar Association awards for its projects and publications.

== History ==
In 1878, the American Bar Association was founded at Saratoga Springs, NY. It soon began to encourage its members to form organizations of the legal profession in their respective states.

In June 1883, Woodrow Wilson left his failing law practice on Spring Street in Atlanta. In September of the same year, the General Assembly, meeting at a building that combined the Atlanta city hall and Fulton County courthouse, appropriated one million dollars to build a new state capitol building on the same site.

The next year, 1884, there was a meeting in Atlanta to form the Georgia Bar Association. The initial members of the Georgia Bar Association were all the Georgia members of the ABA. They chose as the first state bar president L. N. Whittle, who was commander of the Macon Militia during the Civil War.

=== Macon headquarters ===
In the late 19th century, Macon was the population center of Georgia and was easily accessible to the rest of the state. When the state's legal community formed the Georgia Bar Association in 1883, Macon was chosen as its headquarters location, and it remained so for the next 90 years. L.N. Whittle was the first of 10 Macon lawyers to serve as president of the Georgia Bar Association during its eight decades of existence. He and Walter B. Hill, who served as the first secretary/treasurer, were among 11 petitioners from around the state listed on the association's corporate charter when it was granted by the Superior Court of Bibb County on July 19, 1884.

Although membership remained strictly voluntary, the Georgia Bar Association gradually expanded its activities and organizational efforts throughout the state. In 1942, the association set up an office in downtown Macon, utilizing space in the Persons Building offered by the law firm of John B. Harris.

=== Unified Bar ===
Efforts to bring about a unified bar in Georgia began in the late 1920s and continued almost without interruption. In 1963, soon after his inauguration, Governor Carl Sanders was visited by Atlanta lawyers Gus Cleveland and Harry Baxter, who had been delegated by the voluntary Georgia Bar Association to approach the Governor about supporting legislation to create a unified State Bar. It turned out to be an easier task than they expected, as the 37-year-old new lawyer-Governor immediately saw the advantages of an organized Bar capable of enforcing academic and professional standards for would-be lawyers along with a disciplinary process to protect the public from lawyer misconduct.

Sanders later recalled that, "Up until that time, while a fairly rigorous written Bar exam was required of every applicant, it was not nearly as comprehensive and onerous as the one we have today, and there was no multistate component. Also, the Bar association at the time was a toothless tiger, unorganized, with no right to discipline its members." The governor told Baxter and Cleveland (who later served as State Bar president in 1971-72) that his administration would indeed support the unified Bar proposal. He directed his House of Representatives floor leader, future Attorney General Arthur Bolton, and the lieutenant governor, future Supreme Court Justice George T. Smith, to head up the legislative effort.

The harder task was actually passing the bill. "Any time you seek to change something that has been in existence for that many years, it's going to be difficult," Sanders said. "Like many other lawyers, I knew there were going to be some who would not be able to meet the requirements." He recalls there was vigorous opposition to the proposal under the Gold Dome. "I remember Johnnie Caldwell (who later served as the state's insurance commissioner) making a long speech in the House about Abraham Lincoln having read the law by candlelight in a log cabin in Illinois," Sanders said. "He said if that was good enough for Abe Lincoln, it was good enough for Georgia."

In 1963 the General Assembly passed an Act (Ga. L. 1963, p. 70) stating that ". . . the Supreme Court of this State shall be authorized, upon a petition presented by the Georgia Bar Association, to establish, as an administrative arm of the court, a unified self-governing bar association to be known as the 'State Bar of Georgia' composed of all persons now or hereafter licensed to practice law in this State." This Act recited that it gave the Supreme Court authority, upon recommendation of the Georgia Bar Association, to adopt rules and regulations for the organization of a unified bar and to define the rights, duties and obligations of members, including payment of a reasonable license fee, and to otherwise regulate and govern the practice of law in Georgia.

A committee of 22 lawyers was charged with taking the next steps, which included the preparation and filing of a petition with the Supreme Court of Georgia, asking for the Court's approval. Although some opposition was voiced at a hearing in October, the Court issued an order on Dec. 6, 1963, establishing the State Bar of Georgia.Pursuant to this grant of authority, the Supreme Court of Georgia created and established the State Bar of Georgia by court order on December 6, 1963. Thus, the State Bar of Georgia was created pursuant to the authority of the Supreme Court of Georgia and the Act of the Georgia General Assembly approved by the Governor on March 11, 1963 (Georgia Laws 1963, page 70).

The initial draft of the proposed rules for the new State Bar was discussed and agreed upon in an all-day meeting in the conference room of Frank Jones' law firm in Macon, under the leadership of Newell Edenfield of Atlanta, who chaired the organizational committee, and Holcombe Perry of Albany, who was president of the Georgia Bar Association in 1962-63. Attributing the successful incorporation of the Bar in large part to Perry's leadership as president, Jones said, "Holcombe worked hundreds of hours on this undertaking, and few, if any, other lawyers in Georgia could have achieved the success that he did."

In 1968, Jones was elected as the unified Bar's sixth president and the first of three from Macon. He says a highlight of his term was the Supreme Court of Georgia issuing resounding opinions in Wallace v. Wallace and Sams v. Olah, rejecting constitutional challenges to the State Bar of Georgia's existence.

Creation of the unified Bar was not without controversy. The only member of the Board of Governors ever "impeached" by the lawyers in his circuit was due to his support of bar unification. Irwin Stolz was informally impeached—as there was no procedure for that—at a meeting of the Lookout Mountain Circuit Bar Association in 1963. He later served as State Bar president and on the Georgia Court of Appeals, and his law partner, Norman Fletcher, became Chief Justice of the Supreme Court. In their post-judicial careers, Stolz practices law in Athens and practices law and mediates in Rome.

=== Move of headquarters to Atlanta ===
During Frank Jones' presidency of the State Bar, the potential benefits of moving the Bar headquarters from Macon to Atlanta started to become obvious to him. In addition to quarterly meetings of the board of governors that were held around the state and the annual meeting that was almost always in Savannah, there were meetings of the executive committee and various general and special committees and other meetings that Jones sought to attend. "The great majority of these meetings were held in Atlanta, with virtually none in Macon, because Atlanta was more convenient to a majority of attendees and the facilities were limited in Macon," Jones said. "Madrid Williams or Judge Mallory C. Atkinson, our first general counsel, and sometimes both, usually accompanied me in traveling to Atlanta for such meetings and we would talk from time to time about the probable need someday to move the office to Atlanta." Jones also noted that Atlanta was shedding its reputation as what he called "kind of a sleepy metropolis." Starting in the 1960s, there was an explosive growth in the number of lawyers practicing in the Atlanta metropolitan area, and many law firms greatly increased in size.

In 1971-72, Jones served on the Governor's Commission on Judicial Processes, chaired by Hon. Bob Hall. The panel's recommendations resulted in the establishment of the Judicial Qualifications Commission (JQC) as a constitutional body and the Judicial Nominating Commission (JNC) by executive order of each of Georgia's governors. "The meetings of the JQC were invariably held in the Judicial Building because we reported our findings and recommendations to the Supreme Court of Georgia, and the meetings of the JNC were normally held in Atlanta as well," Jones said. "This is another illustration of how Atlanta increasingly became the focus of the activities of the State Bar and related organizations."

A Special Committee on State Bar Headquarters was appointed in 1970, with Jones as chairman and Ben L. Weinberg Jr. as vice chairman. Also serving were B. Carl Buice, Wilton D. Harrington, G. Conley Ingram, H.H. Perry Jr., Hon. Paul W. Painter and Frank W. "Sonny" Seiler, with then- Bar President Irwin W. Stolz Jr., A.G. Cleveland Jr. and Thomas E. Dennard Jr. as ex-officio members. In November 1971, the committee submitted its final report during a meeting of the board of governors, officially recommending that the State Bar headquarters be moved from Macon to downtown Atlanta because, in part, "Ideally, the headquarters should be reasonably close to the State Capitol area, as accessible as possible to those lawyers throughout the state who would enter Atlanta on the interstate and other highways, and at the same time not inconvenient to the large number of State Bar of Georgia members who have their offices in the business and financial district in Atlanta." The fact that the State Bar had been authorized by the Supreme Court of Georgia, and its rules had to be approved by the Supreme Court, was another persuasive reason why the headquarters should be in downtown Atlanta and within reasonable proximity to the Supreme Court.

The report acknowledged that the anticipated doubling of office space, addition of at least one more staff member, higher rental rates and salary scales prevailing in Atlanta and various other factors would result in a substantial increase in operating expenses. A dues increase would undoubtedly be required. One of the committee's recommendations specified: "The State Bar of Georgia should not give any further consideration at this time to building its own headquarters building (as some other state bars have done)." Jones said, "That was a wise decision at the time, I believe. We needed to walk before we could run."

After the committee's recommendations were unanimously approved by the board of governors, the wheels were set in motion for the move from Macon to Atlanta. F. Jack Adams joined committee members Seiler and Cleveland in submitting a detailed report concerning costs and a proposed dues increase, which was approved by the board in July 1972. Increased expenditures were estimated at just over $75,000, necessitating a dues increase of $20 per year. The target date for opening the new headquarters in the Fulton National Bank building was July 1, 1973. By Feb. 9, the contract had already been signed, construction of the offices was underway and moving vans were packed and ready to leave Macon for Atlanta. Seiler, who was the State Bar president that year, recounted, in his end-of-year report for the 1973 annual meeting, what happened next.

"I'll never forget that day," Seiler said of the planned moving day of Feb. 9. "Gus Cleveland, Jack Adams and I were in Cleveland, Ohio, attending the ABA National Conference of Bar Presidents. It was extremely cold in Cleveland, but the skies were clear. We knew that winter storms were harassing the South, and Gus and I had speculated as to whether or not the move could be accomplished. On the day of the intended move, I picked up a Cleveland paper and the headlines read 'Heavy Snow Hits Macon, Georgia,' and I knew darn well they weren't talking about Cubbege Jr. or Sr.!" (Cubbege Snow was the name of a father-son legal duo in Macon, with a third generation having since joined the practice.) The snow melted a few days later, and the new office was fully occupied on Law Day, May 1, 1973, two months ahead of schedule.

Performing an integral role in the move was Madrid Williams, who had originally informed the officers of her intention to retire as executive secretary on Jan. 1, 1973, rather than make the move to Atlanta. "But she got caught up in the excitement," Jones said, and instead of retiring, Williams wound up personally supervising the entire project, coordinating the moving and purchase of equipment, furniture and decorations, as well as interviewing and hiring new staff members. "Her help was invaluable during those first years after the move," Jones said of Williams, who in 1970 became one of the first women to serve as president of the National Association of Bar Executives. She did retire in 1976, a full 34 years after opening the first Georgia Bar Association office. f

According to Jones, opposition to the move from Macon to Atlanta was virtually non-existent, and the only backlash he received from below Georgia's fall line for having spearheaded the effort was some good-natured ribbing from his hometown colleagues. "When I accepted an invitation to become a partner in the firm of King & Spalding LLP in Atlanta as of July 1, 1977, several of my friends jokingly remarked that I was being run out of Macon because I had been instrumental in the move," Jones said. "But I had realized it would be an easier pill to swallow if a past president from Macon was the one making the recommendation."

Jones concluded, "In my judgment both then and now, it was essential that the State Bar have its headquarters conveniently located in downtown Atlanta in order to maximize its service to the lawyers of Georgia, the judiciary and the general public. Such a location provides ready access to the Supreme Court of Georgia, the Governor's Office, the General Assembly and other governmental agencies with which the State Bar has dealings from time to time. It is also consistent with the extraordinary growth in the number of practicing lawyers residing in the greater Atlanta area."

=== Georgia Bar Center ===
In 1995, the State Bar began an effort to establish a Bar Center that would be a professional gathering place for members of the profession from around the state. After an exhaustive search and a struggle with financing, the State Bar purchased the former home of the Federal Reserve Bank of Atlanta. The Georgia Bar Center is reputedly the finest state bar headquarters in the United States, in the assessment of delegates to the ABA midyear meeting in 2011. It includes a conference center used for continuing legal education seminars and professional meetings almost daily, a law related education program that hosts over 10,000 school children each year, the offices of the State Bar and a number of other law related organizations. In addition, visiting bar members enjoy free parking when attending events in downtown Atlanta.

And adjoining the lobby is a small museum depicting a nineteenth-century law office near the site of the Bar Center, where Woodrow Wilson labored until he gave up the "dreadful drudgery" of law practice and boarded a northbound train in 1883.

=== Past Presidents ===
Past presidents of the former Georgia Bar Association and the State Bar of Georgia include the following.

==== Georgia Bar Association ====
This was the voluntary bar that existed in Georgia until 1964.

- 1884 L. N. Whittle, (Note: L. N. Whittle) Macon
- 1885 William M. Reese, Washington
- 1886 Joseph B. Cumming, Augusta
- 1887 Clifford Anderson, (Note: Clifford Anderson) Macon
- 1888 Walter B. Hill, (Note: Walter B. Hill) Macon
- 1889 Marshall J. Clarke, Atlanta
- 1890 George A. Mercer, Savannah
- 1891 Frank H. Miller, Augusta
- 1892 John Peabody, (Note: John Peabody) Columbus
- 1893 Washington Dessau, Macon
- 1894 Logan E. Bleckley, (Note: Logan E. Bleckley) Atlanta
- 1895 William H. Fleming, Augusta
- 1896 John W. Park, Greenville
- 1897 Henry R. Goetchius, Columbus
- 1898 John W. Akin, Cartersville
- 1899 Hamilton McWhorter (Note: Hamilton McWhorter) Lexington
- 1900 Joseph Rucker Lamar, Augusta
- 1901 H. W. Hill, Greenville
- 1902 Charlton E. Battle, Columbus
- 1903 Burton Smith, Atlanta
- 1904 Peter W. Meldrim, Savannah
- 1905 A. P. Persons, Talbotton
- 1906 T. A. Hammond, Atlanta
- 1907 A. L. Miller, Macon
- 1908 Samuel B. Adams, Savannah
- 1909 Jos. Hansel Merrill, Thomasville
- 1910 T. M. Cunningham Jr., Savannah
- 1911 Joel Branham, Rome
- 1912 Alex W. Smith, Atlanta
- 1913 Andrew J. Cobb, Athens
- 1914 Robert C. Alston, Atlanta
- 1915 Sam S. Bennet, Albany
- 1916 George W. Owens, Savannah
- 1917 William H. Barrett, Augusta
- 1918 Orville A. Park, Macon
- 1919 Samuel H. Sibley, Atlanta
- 1920 Luther Z. Rosser, Atlanta
- 1921 Alexander R. Lawton, Savannah
- 1922 Arthur G. Powell, Atlanta
- 1923 Z. D. Harrison, Atlanta
- 1924 William M. Howard, Augusta
- 1925 H. H. Swift, Columbus
- 1926 Leo W. Branch, Quitman
- 1927 Warren Grice, Macon
- 1928 Millard Reese, Brunswick
- 1929 John M. Slaton, (Note: John M. Slaton) Atlanta
- 1930 Rembert Marshall, Atlanta
- 1931 A. W. Cozart, Columbus
- 1932 Hatton Lovejoy, LaGrange
- 1933 Marion Smith, Atlanta
- 1934 H. F. Lawson, Hawkinsville
- 1935 Graham Wright, Rome
- 1936 A. B. Lovett, Savannah
- 1937 Alexander W. Smith Jr., Atlanta
- 1938 William C. Turpin Jr., Macon
- 1939 Joseph B. Cumming, Augusta
- 1940 John L. Tye Jr., Atlanta
- 1941 William Y. Atkinson, Newnan
- 1942 Frank D. Foley, Columbus
- 1943 John B. Harris, Macon
- 1944 Marvin A. Allison, Lawrenceville
- 1945 Charles J. Bloch, Macon
- 1946 Charles L. Gowen, (Note: Charles L. Gowen) Brunswick
- 1947 Robert B. Troutman, Atlanta
- 1948 Vance Custer, Bainbridge
- 1949 Albert J. Henderson, Canton
- 1950 Alexander A. Lawrence, Savannah
- 1951 A. Edward Smith, Columbus
- 1952 F. M. Bird, Atlanta
- 1953 William Butt, Blue Ridge
- 1954 Edward A. Dutton, Savannah
- 1955 John J. Flynt Jr, (Note: John J. Flynt Jr.) Griffin
- 1956 Henry L. Bowden, (Note: Henry L. Bowden) Atlanta
- 1957 Howell Hollis, (Note: Howell Hollis) Columbus
- 1958 Carl K. Nelson, Dublin
- 1959 Robert M. Heard, (Note: Robert M. Heard) Elberton
- 1960 Newell Edenfield, (Note: Newell Edenfield) Atlanta
- 1961 H. C. Eberhardt, Valdosta
- 1962 Maurice C. Thomas, Macon
- 1963 H. H. Perry Jr., Albany
- 1964 Hugh M. Dorsey Jr., Atlanta
- 1965 Will Ed Smith, Eastman

==== State Bar of Georgia ====
The current mandatory bar was instituted in 1965.

- 1964 Hugh M. Dorsey Jr., Atlanta
- 1965 Will Ed Smith, Eastman
- 1966 Henry P. Eve, Augusta
- 1967 Omer W. Franklin Jr., Valdosta
- 1968 David H. Gambrell, (Note: David H. Gambrell) Atlanta
- 1969 Frank C. Jones, (Note: Frank C. Jones) Macon
- 1970 Howell C. Erwin Jr., Athens
- 1971 Irwin W. Stolz Jr., (Note: Irwin W. Stolz Jr.) LaFayette
- 1972 A. Gus Cleveland, (Note: A. Gus Cleveland) Atlanta
- 1973 Frank W. Seiler, (Note: Frank W. Seiler) Savannah
- 1974 F. Jack Adams, Cornelia
- 1975 Cubbedge Snow Jr., (Note: Cubbedge Snow Jr.) Macon
- 1976 W. Stell Huie, Atlanta
- 1977 Harold G. Clarke, (Note: Harold G. Clarke) Forsyth
- 1978 Wilton D. Harrington, Eastman
- 1979 Charles H. Hyatt, (Note: Charles H. Hyatt) Decatur
- 1980 Kirk M. McAlpin, Atlanta
- 1981 Robert Reinhardt, (Note: Robert Reinhardt) Tifton
- 1982 J. Douglas Stewart, (Note: J. Douglas Stewart) Gainesville
- 1983 Frank Love Jr., (Note: Frank Love Jr.) Atlanta
- 1984 Richard Y. Bradley, (Note: Richard Y. Bradley) Columbus
- 1985 Duross Fitzpatrick, (Note: Duross Fitzpatrick) Macon
- 1986 Jule W. Felton Jr., (Note: Jule W. Felton Jr.) Atlanta
- 1987 Robert M. Brinson, (Note: Robert M. Brinson) Rome
- 1988 Littleton Glover Jr., (Note: J. Littleton Glover Jr.) Newnan
- 1989 A. James Elliott, (Note: A. James Elliott) Atlanta
- 1990 Gene Mac Winburn, (Note: Gene Mac Winburn) Athens
- 1991 Evans J. Plowden Jr., (Note: Evans J. Plowden Jr.) Albany
- 1992 Charles T. Lester Jr., (Note: Charles T. Lester Jr.) Atlanta
- 1993 Paul Kilpatrick Jr., (Note: Paul Kilpatrick Jr.) Columbus
- 1994 John C. Sammon, (Note: John C. Sammon) Decatur
- 1995 Harold T. Daniel Jr., (Note: Harold T. Daniel Jr.) Atlanta
- 1996 Robert W. Chasteen Jr., (Note: Robert W. Chasteen Jr.) Fitzgerald
- 1997 Ben F. Easterlin IV, (Note: Ben F. Easterlin IV) Atlanta
- 1998 Linda A. Klein, (Note: Linda A. Klein) Atlanta
- 1999 William E. Cannon Jr., (Note: William E. Cannon Jr.) Albany
- 2000 Rudolph N. Patterson, (Note: Rudolph N. Patterson) Macon
- 2001 George E. Mundy, (Note: George E. Mundy) Cedartown
- 2002 James B. Franklin, (Note: James B. Franklin) Statesboro
- 2003 James B. Durham, (Note: James B. Durham) Brunswick
- 2004 William D. Barwick, (Note: William D. Barwick) Atlanta
- 2005 Rob Reinhardt, Tifton
- 2006 Robert Ingram, (Note: Robert Ingram) Marietta
- 2007 Vincent Cook, (Note: J. Vincent Cook) Athens
- 2008 Gerald M. Edenfield, (Note: Gerald M. Edenfield) Statesboro
- 2009 Jeffrey O. Bramlett, (Note: Jeffrey O. Bramlett) Atlanta
- 2010 Bryan M. Cavan, (Note: Bryan M. Cavan) Newnan
- 2011 S. Lester Tate III, (Note: S. Lester Tate III) Cartersville
- 2012 Kenneth L. Shigley, (Note: Kenneth L. Shigley) Atlanta
- 2013 Robin Frazer Clark, (Note: Robin Frazer Clark) Atlanta
- 2014 Charles L. Ruffin, Macon
- 2015 Patrise M. Perkins-Hooker, Atlanta
- 2016 Robert J. "Bob" Kauffman, Douglasville
- 2017 Patrick T. O'Connor, Savannah
- 2018 Brian D. "Buck" Rogers, Atlanta
- 2019 Kenneth B. Hodges III, Albany
- 2020 Darrell Sutton, Marietta
- 2021 Elizabeth L. Fite, Atlanta
