= Eloise B. Cushing =

American attorney (1887–1977)

- Eloise B. Cushing, 1946
- Born: October 29, 1887; Redding, California, U.S.
- Died: Oakland, California, U.S. July 6, 1977 (aged 89)
- Education: Oakland High School; University of California, Berkeley; UC Berkeley School of Law
- Occupations: attorney; librarian
- Employer: Alameda County Law Library
- Organizations: Soroptimist International; Kappa Beta Pi
- Known for: Major writing of the Soroptimist International's first Constitution and By-Laws
- Board member of: Alameda County Bar Board of Trustees

Eloise B. Cushing (1887–1977) was an American attorney. She was the first woman to engage actively in the practice of law in Oakland, California. A life-long member of Soroptimist International since joining in 1921, she did the major writing of the organization's first Constitution and By-Laws, which was required to file for the Charter; this document went on to serve as the guidelines for all the national and international Soroptimist clubs. For 47 years, she served as the librarian of the Alameda County Law Library.

== Early life and education ==
Cushing was born in Redding, California, on October 29, 1887, daughter of Eugene Z. and Mary (Buckley) Cushing. Cushing is one of the oldest and most honored names in New England colonial history. The founder of the family was Matthew Cushing, who came from Norfolk County, England, and settled at Hingham, Massachusetts, where the old Cushing homestead stood. One of the Cushings at the time of the Revolution was on a committee having something to do with the United States Declaration of Independence. Both the Cushing and Buckley families contained many doctors and lawyers. Charles Bennett, a relative of Mary Buckley, was for many years secretary of state of Rhode Island.

During the American Civil War, Cushing had uncles fighting for both the North and the South, and it was afterwards learned that "one uncle was chasing the other across the same battlefield." The most distinguished member of the Cushing family in the Civil war was Lieut. William Cushing, who carried out the dangerous exploit involved in sinking the Confederate Ironclad Albemarle. Cushing's mother was born at Staunton, Virginia, and as a child, she witnessed Sheridan's raid up the Shenandoah Valley. Later, she moved to Covington, Kentucky, where she met and married Eugene Z. Cushing, whose father was a doctor. Eugene Z. Cushing became a lawyer, and after coming to California, practiced for a time at Redding, for several years in San Diego, California, and in 1888, established his family at Oakland.

Cushing's first memories are of the family home when it was on Moss Avenue, then considered a part of the country. She witnessed a city develop from what was a village when she was a girl. Her ambition from earliest years was to be a teacher, and her work in school was chosen with that object in view.

She took the courses of the grammar grades in St. Mary's parochial school, and after passing the entrance examinations in 1904 entered the Oakland High School, from which she was graduated in 1908. In high school she specialized in French and mathematics, which she intended as her major subjects in college. She also took part in the senior play.

In 1908, she entered the University of California, Berkeley, remaining until 1910, when she received a Junior Certificate with honorable mention. On account of the sudden death of her sister Claire, she was forced to leave college.

== Career ==
In May 1910, she became librarian of the Alameda County Law Library, having acted as assistant librarian for five years preceding. While serving as the librarian, she also represented the bar of the county on the board of trustees. In June and December, 1910, she took the county examinations and in December of that year, received a certificate to teach in the grammar grades. While she was then qualified to realize the ambition of her earlier years, she never used the certificate.

She remained at her duties as librarian, and as time went on, became more and more interested in the law. Largely through the advice of Mr. Minor, a Berkeley attorney, she decided to study for the bar. The trustees of the library gave her permission to attend law classes at the university during the morning provided she found a substitute. Her brother was able to help her out, and thus in the fall of 1915, she reentered college, completing first a year of academic work and then entering the UC Berkeley School of Law. She obtained the A. B. degree in 1917, and from the law school was graduated J.D. in 1919.

In 1918, she took and passed the bar examinations and was admitted to practice before the state and Federal courts. Since then, she handled a large volume of general practice, though comparatively little in the criminal branch of the law. Cushing was a charter member of the Kappa Beta Pi, the legal honorary sorority. was a delegate to the second national convention of this organization held in Washington, D.C.

She was a charter member of the Soroptimist Club of Alameda County of which she was elected its president in December 1925, and later became acting president; charter member of the Business and Professional Women's Club of Oakland, of which she was parliamentarian; member of the Oakland Forum and on its legislative committee; on the legislative committee of the League of Women Voters of California. She served on the Speakers' Bureau for the Oakland Community Chest. She was a member of the Catholic Daughters of America.

== Death ==
She died in Oakland, on July 6, 1977.
