= Marcel Alexandre Bertrand =

French geologist

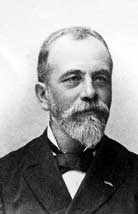
- Marcel Alexandre Bertrand
- Born: 2 July 1847
- Died: 13 February 1907 (aged 59)
- Education: École Polytechnique
- Known for: orogeny
- Scientific career
- Fields: geology

Marcel Alexandre Bertrand (2 July 1847 – 13 February 1907) was a French geologist born in Paris. He was the son of mathematician Joseph Louis François Bertrand (1822–1900), and son-in-law to physicist Éleuthère Mascart (1837-1908).

He studied at the École Polytechnique, and beginning in 1869 he attended the Ecole des Mines de Paris. From 1877 he carried out geological mapping studies of Provence, the Jura Mountains and the Alps. In 1886, he became an instructor at the École Nationale Supérieure des Mines, and in 1896 became a member of the Académie des sciences.

Bertrand, a founder of modern tectonics, originated an orogenic "wave theory" of mountain-building and introduced the nappe hypothesis (nappe de charriage). His wave theory described a build-up of massive folds of earth taking place over successive geological eras, called the Caledonian, Hercynian and Alpine periods of orogeny. Bertrand later added a fourth event called the Huronian orogeny, which took place 2400 to 2100 million years ago, in Precambrian time.

In 1890 he was named president of the Société géologique de France. The Concours de Géologie twice awarded him the Prix Vaillant (1886 and 1890); he also won the Prix Fontannes (of the Société géologique de France) in 1888 and the Prix Petit d'Ormoy in 1893.

== Personal life ==
He was married to Mathilde Mascart and their daughter, Thérèse Bertrand-Fontaine (1895 – 1987), became a physician and researcher. She was only the third woman to be named a full member of the National Academy of Medicine.

== Selected works ==
- Études dans les Alpes françaises. structure en éventail, massifs amygdaloïdes et métamorphisme 1894 – Studies of the French Alps.
- Sur la structure du mont Joly près de Saint-Gervais (Haute-Savoie), 1896 – On the Mount Joly structure near Saint-Gervais (Haute-Savoie).
- Les chaînes septentrionales des Alpes bernoises, 1899 – The northern chain of the Bernese Alps.
- La grande nappe de recouvrement de la Basse-Provence, 1899 – The large nappe layer of Lower Provence.
- Mémoire sur les refoulements qui ont plissé l’écorce terrestre et sur le rôle des déplacements horizontaux, 1908.
- Œuvres géologiques de Marcel Bertrand (with Emmanuel de Margerie; 3 volumes, 1927–31) – Geological works of Marcel Bertrand.
