= Nannie C. Dunsmoor =

American physician (1860–1941)

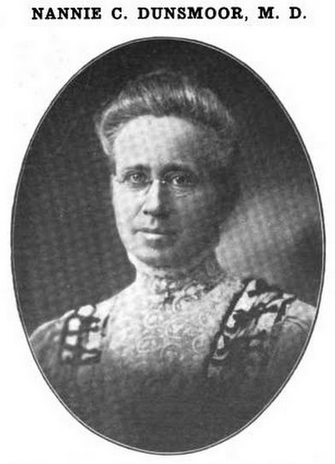
Nannie C. Dunsmoor, from a 1910 publication.

Nannie C. Straus Dunsmoor (November 17, 1860 – July 18, 1941) was an American physician and one of the first woman to be a medical doctor in California. She continued to practice into her 80s. She was the oldest active member in the United States of the Soroptimist Club.

== Early life ==
Nannie C. Straus was born on November 17, 1860, in Clarksville, Tennessee, the daughter of Louis and Ann Straus. The family moved to California in 1875.

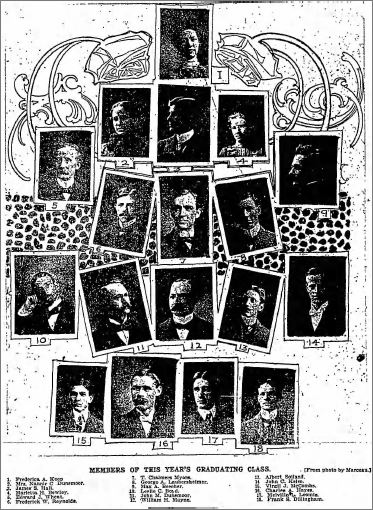
Nannie C. Dunsmoor

She graduated in 1887 from Los Angeles High School on Poundcake Hill. More than ten years after graduation from high school, together with her husband, she decided to study medicine and enrolled in pre-medical courses at the University of Southern California. She graduated from the College of Medicine in 1900, a pioneer in this field in California, in the same class of her husband, and they became physicians and surgeons.

== Career ==
Nannie C. Dunsmoor was Chief Surgeon at the Los Angeles Receiving Hospital. She was a member of the Hollywood Hospital Staff. She was Medical examiner for the Pacific Mutual Life Insurance Co.

She was the first woman physician in Los Angeles to drive a gasoline car, and continued for 33 years, stopping only at 79 years old, when her eyesight was compromised.

She was the president of the Professional Women's Club. She was president and treasurer of the Alpha Epsilon Iota.

She continued to practice into her 80s. She was the oldest active member in the United States of the Soroptimist Club.

She was member of the Friday Morning Club, Order of the Eastern Star, Women's Athletic Club, and the Pioneer Society of Los Angeles.

== Personal life ==
Nannie C. Straus married Dr. John M. Dunsmoor who at the time of their wedding was a school teacher. They had one son, Dr. Robert M. Dunsmoor who became a physician and surgeon at the Georgia Street Receiving Hospital. They lived at 925 Pacific Mutual Bldg., Los Angeles, California, and later moved to 119 N. Belmont Avenue.

Her husband died in 1931 and she died on July 18, 1941.
