= Thérèse Bertrand-Fontaine =

French physician (1895–1987)

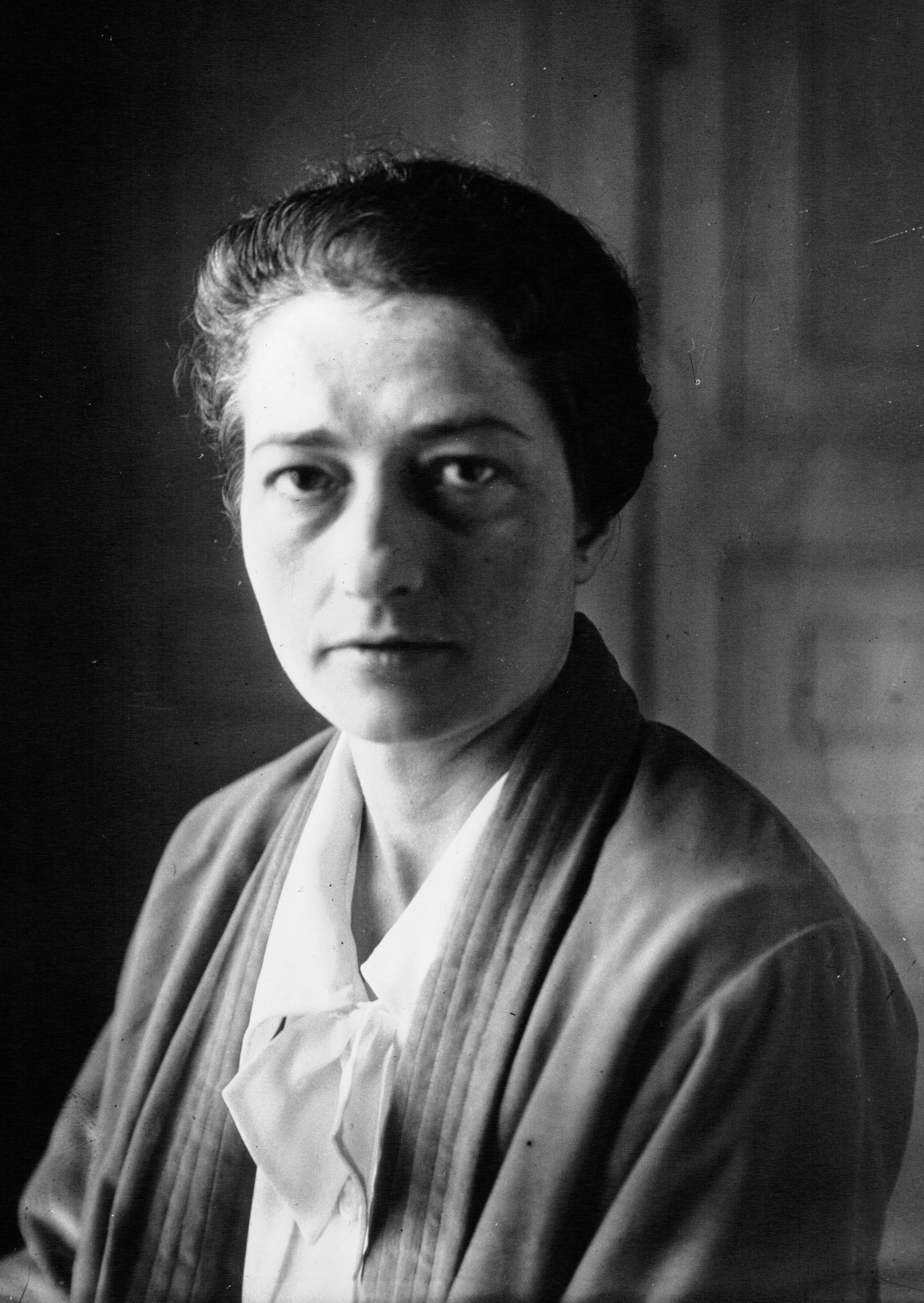
- Dr. Bertrand-Fontaine in 1930
- Born: Thérèse Marcelle Bertrand; 15 October 1895; Paris, France
- Died: 24 December 1987 (aged 92); Paris, France
- Occupations: Physician, researcher
- Spouse: Philippe Fontaine
- Children: Two
- Parents: Marcel Alexandre Bertrand (father); Mathilde Mascart (mother)

Thérèse Bertrand-Fontaine (15 October 1895, in Paris – 24 December 1987, in Paris), was a French physician and researcher. She earned the Medal of the Resistance and held the title of Grand Officer of the Legion of Honor.

== Life and work ==
Thérèse Marcelle Bertrand was born in 1895 into an accomplished family. She was the daughter of Mathilde Mascart and geologist Marcel Alexandre Bertrand (1847–1907), the founder of modern tectonics. Thérèse's father and two grandfathers (mathematician Joseph Louis François Bertrand and physicist Éleuthère Élie Nicolas Mascart) were all members of the French Academy of Sciences.

She married the industrialist Philippe Fontaine in 1919 and they raised two children: Martine (1920-1996) and Rémi (1923–1945).

=== Physician ===
Bertrand-Fontaine studied at the private school Collège Sévigné, then at the Faculty of Medicine in Paris. She was a hospital intern for four years in Paris hospitals, specializing in surgery from 1922 to 1926, and then she moved to head of clinic in 1926 before graduating to become a hospital doctor. Doing so in 1930, she became the first female doctor in Paris hospitals.

During World War II, she was head of department at Maison Dubois (currently Fernand Widal hospital). She worked for the French Resistance and was "responsible for the passive defense of the Lariboisière hospital and the neighborhood." She replaced another professor who was mobilized for the war effort and then became part of the "Steering Committee of the Medical Resistance." Her work during the war earned her the French Medal of the Resistance.

After the war, Bertrand-Fontaine was named head of department at Beaujon hospital in Paris where she remained from 1945 to 1961.

Bertrand-Fontaine also served as president of the Medical Society of Hospitals until 1961.

=== Research ===
Her medical research was "devoted to infectious and parasitic pathologies, hepatic and renal diseases, and in particular, nephrology, to amyloidosis."

== Selected works ==
- Clinical and anatomical study of Friedländer pneumo-bacillus pneumonia, medical thesis, Paris, Amédée Legrand, 1926.
- Sign of Argyll-Roberston, Poitiers, 1930 (with René Moreau and Raymond Garcin).
- Tumor of the cervical marrow evolving under the features of amyotrophic lateral sclerosis, ablation, cure, Poitiers, 1933 (with Raymond Garcin, D. Petit-Dutaillis and J. Laplane).
- On three cases of giant cell sarcomas of the breast, Paris, Masson, 1933 (with H. Hartmann and P. Guérin).
- Hemophilia and hemogenesis, sl, 1934; off-print of an extract from the Revue odontologique, June 1934.
- Ptérygium colli, Bobigny, 1943 (with Marcel Fèvre).
- Breast tumors, Paris, Masson, 1951 (with Henri Hartmann and Paul Guérin).
- The Ascending Nephrites, Paris, Masson, 1955.

== Honors ==
- Full member of the National Academy of Medicine, 20 May 1969, only the third woman to receive that honor.
- Grand officer of the Legion of Honor.
- Medal of the Resistance.
