= Suzanne Noël =

French plastic surgeon (1878–1954)

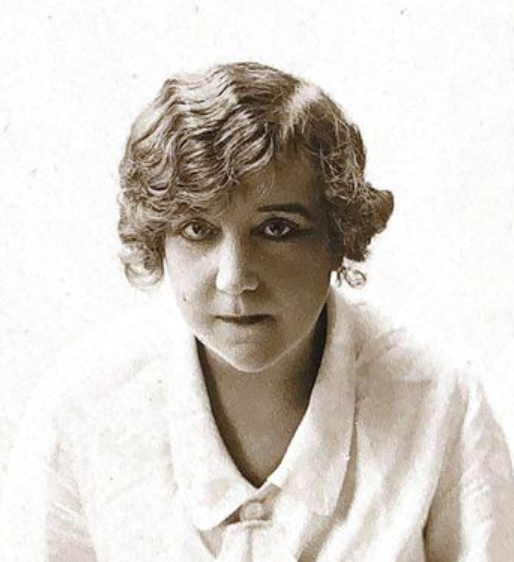
- Born: Suzanne Blanche Gros Noël; 19 January 1878
- Died: 11 November 1954 (aged 76)
- Occupation: Plastic surgeon
- Known for: First woman plastic surgeon in world

Suzanne Blanche Gros Noël (19 January 1878 – 11 November 1954), also known as Madame Noël, was a French plastic surgeon and the first female plastic surgeon in the world. She was known for her efficient face lift technique, the "petite operation". Noël was also a very active feminist, a philosophy which was considered radical for a practising cosmetic surgeon. She was the founder of Soroptimist International of Europe (SIE) and had a career spanning from 1916 to 1950. At the outbreak of World War I, without having been able to defend her doctoral thesis, like all the interns, Suzanne Gros was allowed to practise medicine in the city. She then joined Professor Hippolyte Morestin at the Val-de-Grâce military hospital in Paris. In 1916, she trained in the techniques of reparative and corrective surgery and in 1918, she received the Silver Medal of National Recognition for her participation and contributions to the war effort.

== Early life ==
Born on 19 January 1878 in Laon, France, Suzanne was the only surviving child of a wealthy family. Her father died when she was only 6 years old. At the age of nineteen, she married Henri Pertat, a physician nine years her senior. In 1905, she started taking medical classes in order to work with her husband. She did well in her studies and in 1912 passed the Internat des Hospitaux de Paris after the birth of her daughter, Jacqueline. She was the fourth of sixty-seven students to pass this exam. In 1919, her first husband, Henri Pertat died. Noёl married a fellow dermatology student, André Noёl, who had fought in World War I. After the death of her daughter at the age of 13, in 1924 André Noёl threw himself into Seine River in front of Suzanne.

== Surgical career ==
Noёl developed an interest in cosmetic surgery when she saw that the French actress Sara Bernhardt, who was over sixty years in age, had returned from a trip "looking rather rejuvenated" in 1912. Noёl began to experiment with pinching her skin to see if she could acquire the same effect. She later moved to experimenting on anaesthetized rabbits. When she started her practice in 1916, Noël was allowed to treat wounded soldiers for facial surgeries during World War I. She received training on how to operate on disfiguring scars and the rejuvenation of wrinkled faces. Since most of the hospitals did not want to have a doctor who specialised only in cosmetic surgery, she decided to set up a clinic in her home. Her practice was limited to minor surgeries such as face lifts and eyelid corrections. Her famous "petite operation" was a technique in which she would make small invisible incisions along the hairline, before suturing just enough skin to fabricate tension without excising any underlying tissue. She became well known for drawing "world-renowned persons of the fashion world and of the European aristocracy" to her clinic. At the onset of World War II, she gave up her private practice at home and moved to practice at the Clinique des Bluets in Paris. In Paris she began doing bolder surgeries such as reshaping the breasts, slimming the abdomen and arms, excising fat from the legs and eliminating wrinkles in the hand by injecting a sclerosing solution into the blood vessels. Noël's concern for her patient's well-being extended beyond surgery as she would make incisions behind the hairline or dye the bandage to match their hair colour. She would even suggest changing one's hairstyle or buying a new hat so they would not have to explain what happened to friends and family who were unaware of the surgery. In 1926, she wrote a plastic surgery handbook called La Chirurgie Esthétique, which was about her specific techniques and was only the sixth book dedicated to cosmetic surgery when it was published.

She was awarded the Legion of Honor from the Foreign Office for being a "doctor of unusual skill". This was a stepping stone for all female surgeons as it was a time when women were struggling to get a foothold in the medical field. Noёl also believed in a woman’s right to vote; she even compared a woman's right to vote to their right to change an "ugly face" or "humiliating body". She believed that every woman should be able to have a youthful appearance and be able to choose their own destiny as they see fit. In an attempt to gain this right, she organised a strike on paying taxes as she believed people should not pay taxes for the things outside of their control.

== Soroptimism ==
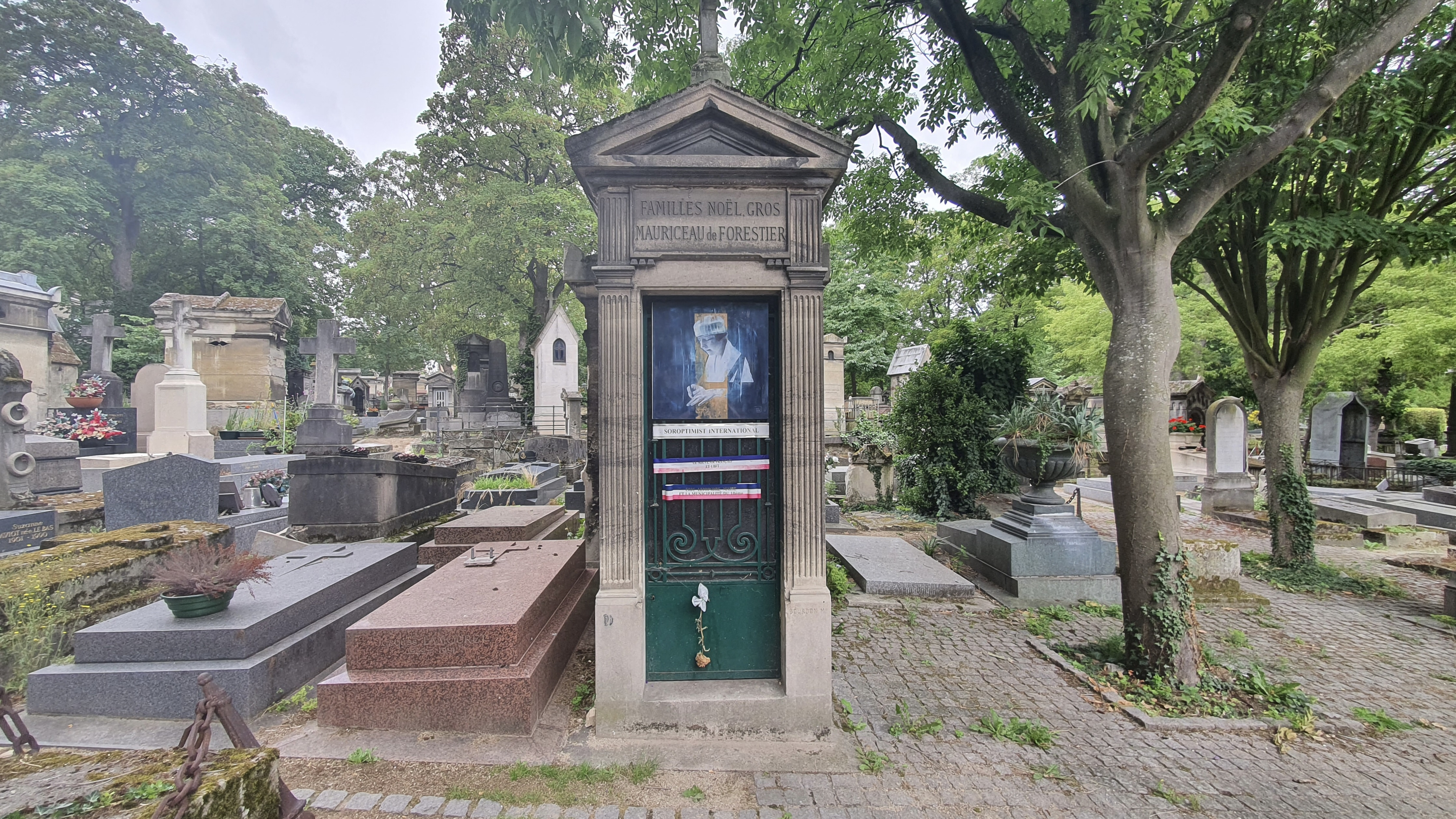
Monument to Suzanne Noël in Montmartre Cemetery

In 1923, Noël became interested in Soroptimism, a movement for professional women. In 1924, she set up one of the first of these clubs in Europe, in Paris. She went on to found chapters in ten other European capitals, and in 1930, she became the first president of the European Federation, travelling globally in support of Soroptimism until the end of her life.

Suzanne Noël died on 11 November 1954 at the age of 76. She was buried in the Montmartre Cemetery.

== Legacy ==
After her death, a fund in her name was established within the Soroptimists International Europe. The main purpose of the Bourse de Dr. Suzanne Noël is to help cover the cost of continuing education for women physicians who are interested in plastic and reconstructive surgery.

A sculpture “Suzanne and I” (1878–1954), paying tribute to Noël's helping the war wounded of World War I through her work in plastic surgery, was unveiled on 11 November 2018 at the former Annecy hospital. The event marked the centenary of the Armistice.

In 2026, Noël was announced as one of 72 historical women in STEM whose names have been proposed to be added to the 72 men already celebrated on the Eiffel Tower. The plan was announced by the Mayor of Paris, Anne Hidalgo following the recommendations of a committee led by Isabelle Vauglin of Femmes et Sciences and Jean-François Martins, representing the operating company which runs the Eiffel Tower.
