= List of women's clubs =

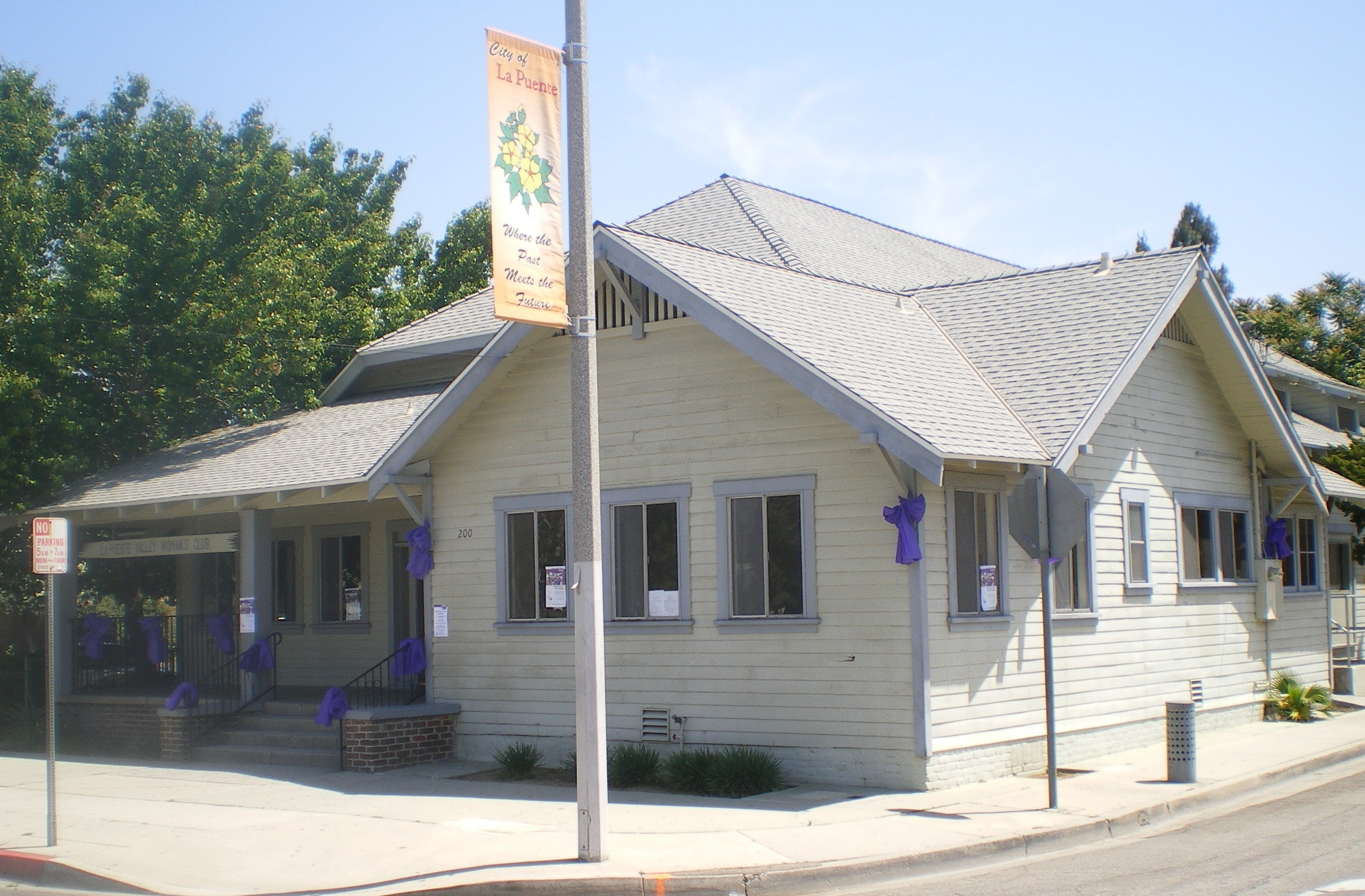
La Puente Valley Woman's Club

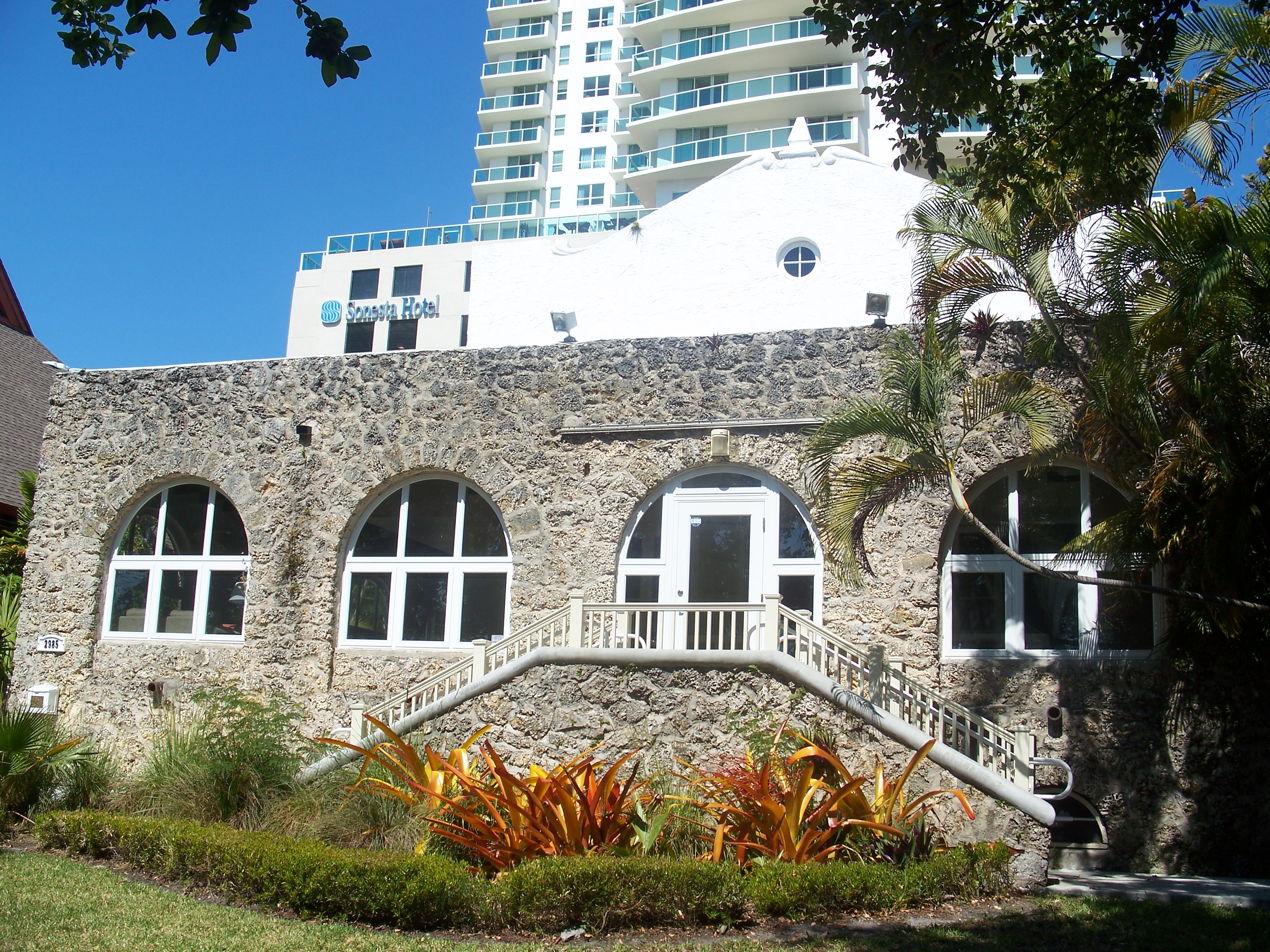
Women's Club of Coconut Grove, founded in 1891

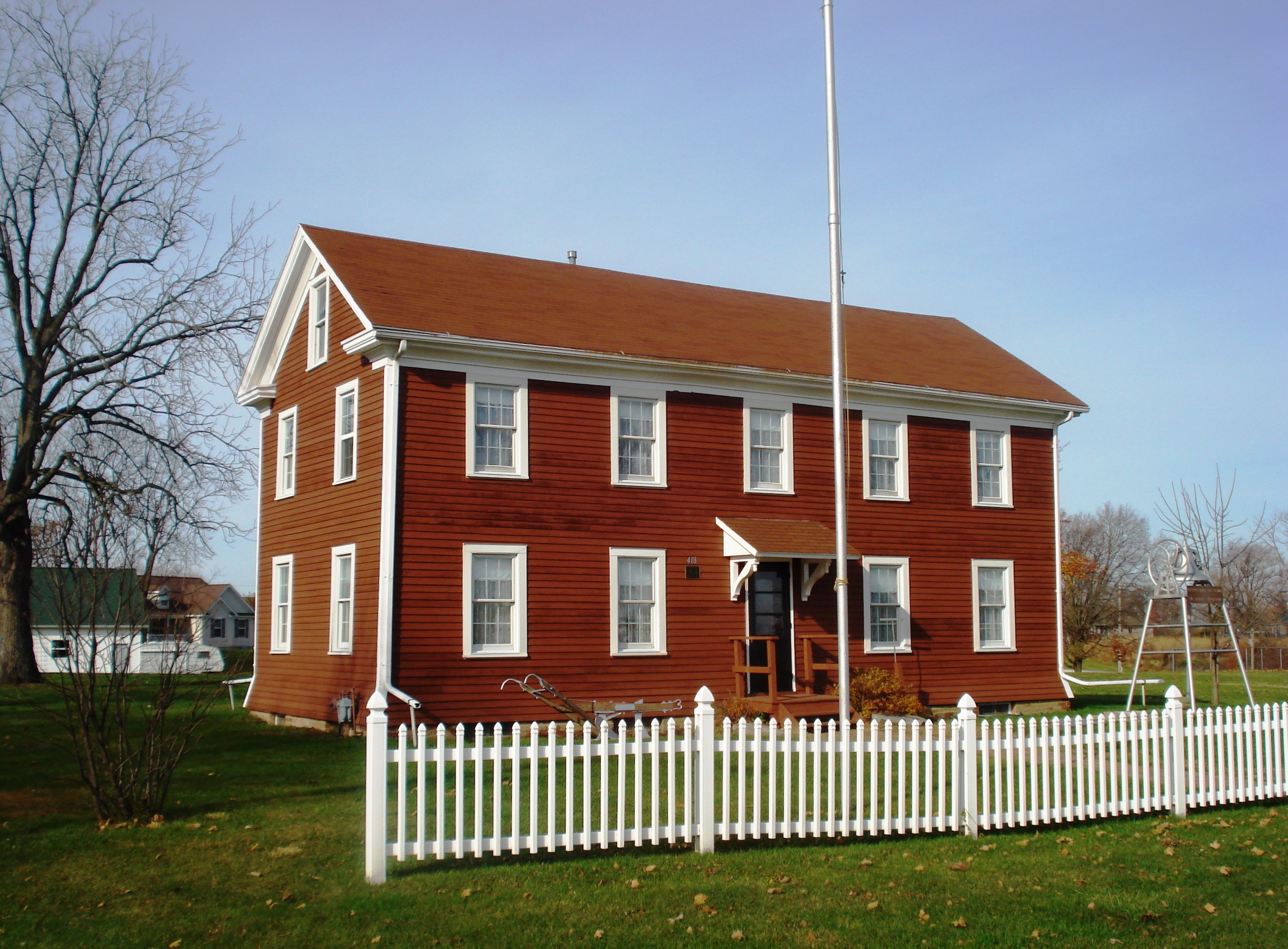
Andover Chapter House, in 2011

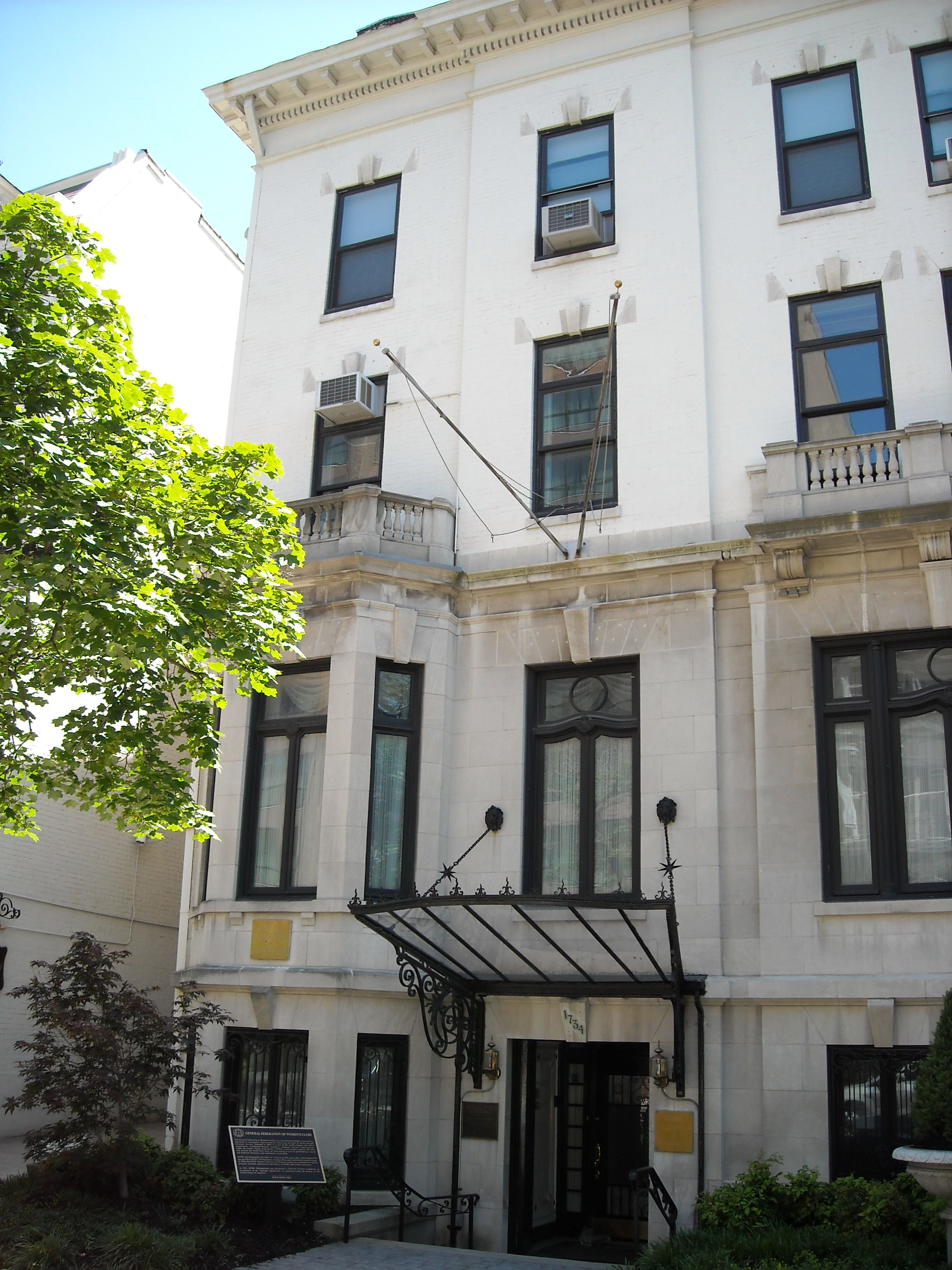
General Federation of Women's Clubs Headquarters

Woman's clubs or women's clubs are examples of the woman's club movement. Many local clubs and national or regional federations were influential in history. The importance of some local clubs is demonstrated by their women's club buildings being listed on historic registries.

In the United States, the General Federation of Women's Clubs (GFWC) became the primary umbrella organization of women's clubs in the United States. "For the later part of the nineteenth century and much of the twentieth century, the women's clubs were an essential vehicle for women's activity outside of the home." In New Mexico alone, a state federation grew to include 59 clubs.

In Australia, the Country Women's Association had numerous clubs.

Most historical women's clubs served social and charitable purposes, most of which may seem relatively uncontroversial today. These purposes have included voluntary civic service purposes such as:

- opening lending libraries and seeking funding to create permanent public libraries
- pursuing historic preservation
- advocating for women's suffrage, other rights for women
- campaigning against lynching and Jim Crow laws
- serving as professional women's clubs, comparable to historic men's clubs of London
- serving as athletic clubs or otherwise supporting sports, physical activity
- addressing sanitation and health issues
- hosting social activities, including card games
- hosting lectures and otherwise engaging in education
- addressing employment and labor conditions

Some women's groups with a more activist political orientation which used "club" in their name, such as perhaps the Alpha Suffrage Club which fought for black female suffrage in Chicago, are included here, too.

== Notable examples ==
=== International ===
- Red Hat Society, international social organization
- International Association of Lyceum Clubs, founded in 1904 in London, England, asserted to have clubs in 17 countries. Was formed as a place for women involved with literature, journalism, art, science and medicine to meet in an atmosphere that was similar to the men's professional clubs of that era.
- List of Cosmopolitan Clubs. England, Australia, New Zealand, Canada, China, India, U.S. (Are/were these all women's clubs? The ones in Philadelphia and NYC were, and have articles, and are separate items below.)
- Junior League, founded in 1901 in New York City, went international in 1926. A charitable women's empowerment organization. Over 295 Leagues around the world.
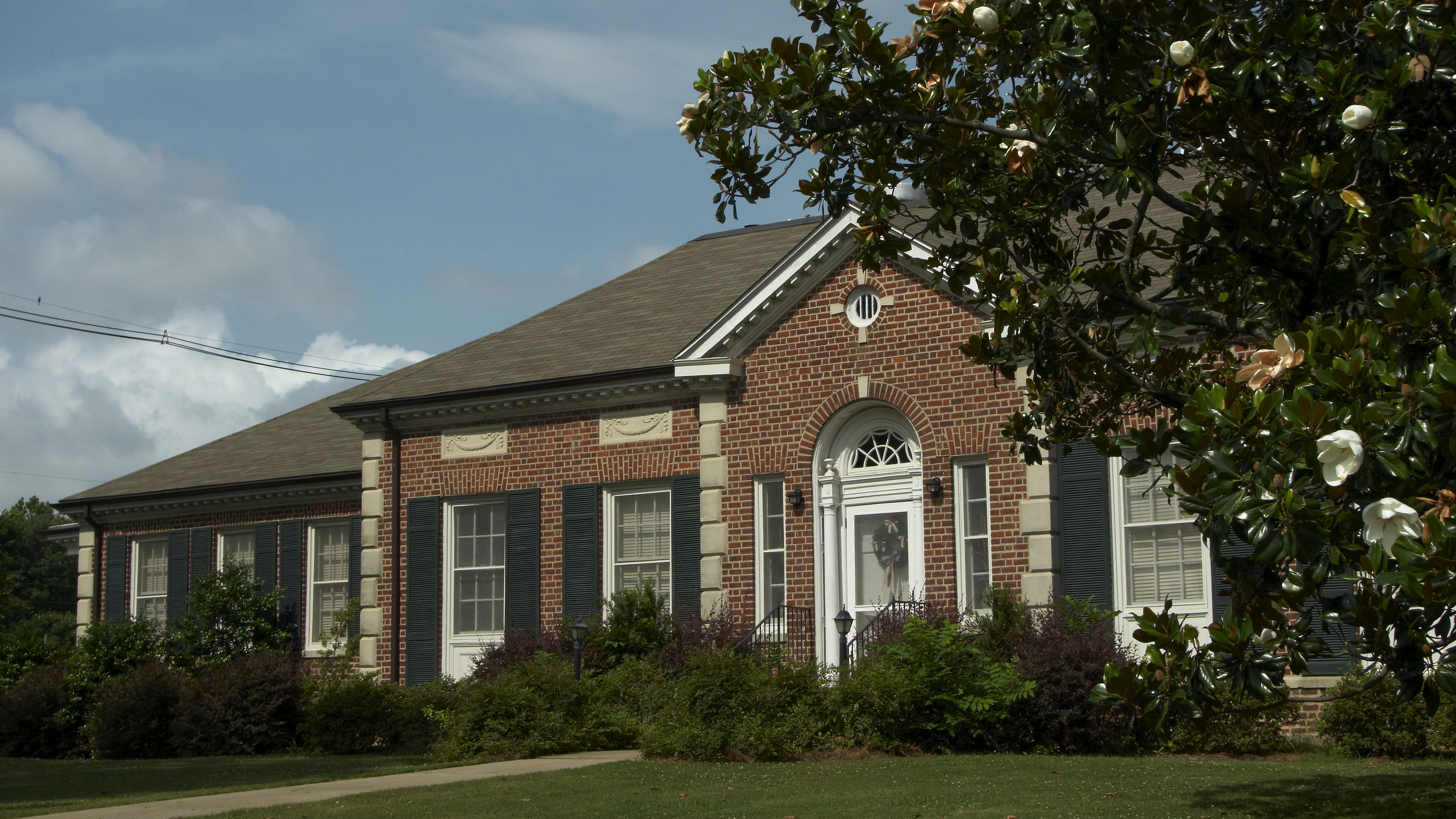
- Mississippi Federation of Women's Clubs Headquarters - Photo Taken in 2013
  P.E.O. Sisterhood, founded as a sorority in Iowa in 1869, went national in 1883. A charitable organization.
- Woman's Christian Temperance Union, organized in Ohio in 1873, has affiliates in Australia, Canada, Germany, Finland, India, Japan, New Zealand, Norway, South Korea, United Kingdom, and the United States
- Women's International Motorcycle Association, founded in 1950, in 25 countries, purports to be the largest women's motorcycle organization
- Women for Sobriety, founded in 1976, for women only, an alternative to the Twelve Steps program of Alcoholics Anonymous.
- Women in the Wind (motorcycle club), founded in 1979, has had 100 chapters in the United States, Canada, Great Britain and Portugal, also purports to be the largest women's motorcycle organization
- Young Women's Christian Association (YWCA), founded as an international organization in 1894, had roots from 1855. In 120 countries.

=== Australia ===
- Adelaide Women's Club
- Bunbury Women's Club
- Brisbane Women's Club
- Karrakatta Club
- Lyceum Club (Australia)
- Queen Adelaide Club
- Queen's Club
- Queen Mary Club
- Wonglepong QCWA Hall

=== Azerbaijan ===
- Ali Bayramov Club, Baku, founded in 1920 as a literacy and sewing circle, it campaigned for women's unveiling and literacy.

=== Cost Rica ===
- Women's Club of Costa Rica (1940–Present), San José. Founded as the "USA Woman's Club of Costa Rica".

=== Cuba ===
- Lyceum and Lawn Tennis Club (1929–39), Havana. A women's cultural, social, and physical fitness organization; it established Cuba's first free public library, first children's library, and first course of instruction for librarians.

=== England ===
- Ladies' Alpine Club (1907–1975), London, the first mountaineering club for women.
- Ladies Dining Society (1890-World War I), Cambridge, a private women's dining and discussion club at Cambridge University. Primarily wives of male professors and college fellows. Members campaigned for Cambridge to grant degrees to women, and most were strong supporters of female suffrage.
- Pioneer Club (women's club), London
  - Grosvenor Crescent Club, London, which split off from the Pioneer Club
- University Women's Club, Mayfair, London

=== Greece ===
- Lyceum Club of Greek Women, founded in Athens in 1911, has 51 branches including 16 outside of Greece. Its purpose is to preserve and promote Greek cultural heritage and it opened, in 1988, the Museum of the History of the Greek Costume.

=== United States ===
In the United States a number of clubs were established, and corresponding buildings were built, in the early 1900s as part of a scheme by publisher Edward Gardner Lewis to promote sales of Woman's Magazine, but many more were independent organizations.

Numerous women's club buildings have been evaluated for listing on the U.S. National Register of Historic Places (NRHP) individually or as part of wider collections. Historic preservation studies have been conducted for women's clubhouses in Florida, in Illinois, in New Jersey, in New Mexico, and in Olympia, Washington

Women's clubs in the United States were indexed by the GFWC, and also by Helen M. Winslow who published an annual "register and directory" of the GFWC ones and some more, which was in its 24th annual edition in 1922. The GWFC did not admit clubs for African-American women, and Winslow's directory seems to omit them too.

Various clubs for black women / African American women are included by state below, but see also Category:National Association of Colored Women's Clubs which includes a number of them.

==== Multiple locations nationwide, primarily in United States ====
- American Association of University Women, founded as "Association of Collegiate Alumnae" in 1882
- American News Women's Club, established in 1932 as a newspaper club for female reporters. The club's records are held at the University of Maryland Archives.
- Association of Southern Women for the Prevention of Lynching, founded in 1930 in Atlanta, Georgia, grew throughout the south to have a claimed presence in nearly every county throughout the south. Fought against lynchings of black persons. Was restricted to white women only to better be able to affect white women opinions generally, and to address purported motivation of lynching to "protect" white women.
- Colonial Dames of America (CDA), founded 1890, just before DAR and NSCDA
- Daughters of the American Revolution (DAR), organized in 1890 after the Sons of the American Revolution would not admit women and expand to become "Sons and Daughters". Promotes historic preservation, education, and patriotism. Membership limited to direct lineal descendants of soldiers or others of the American Revolution. Eclipsed the "Sons" in membership? with 195,000 members?
- Embroiderers' Guild of America, established in 1958 as a branch of 1906-founded Embroiderers' Guild headquartered in London, England, and split off later. Is this a women's club? Seems was not exclusively for women, but probably was effectively a women's club.
- Executive Women's Golf Association, founded in 1991, headquartered in Palm Beach Gardens, Florida; in 2014 had 114 chapters throughout the United States, and 1 chapter each in Canada, Bermuda, South Africa, Ireland and Italy.
- General Federation of Women's Clubs (GFWC), founded in 1890, federation of more than 3,000 women's clubs.
  - National Association of Colored Women's Clubs (NACWC), founded 1896 from merger of 1895-founded National Federation of Afro-American Women, the c. 1892–94 Women's Era Club of Boston, and the National League of Colored Women (founded when?) of Washington, D.C.
- Ladies' Memorial Association, founded in 1865 in Winchester, Virginia
- Ladies of the Grand Army of the Republic (Ladies of the G.A.R.), founded 1881 as "Loyal Ladies League", went national and assumed current name in 1886. It claims to be the oldest women's hereditary organization in the United States.
- League of Women Voters, founded in 1920 at the final convention of the National American Women Suffrage Association, to support educating women to take part in the political process.
- The Links, Incorporated, founded in 1946; the largest and most influential organization for Black women
- MacDowell Clubs, first founded in 1896 in Boston, about 400 in number, mostly choosing to be female only
- National Council of Jewish Women
- National Federation of Business and Professional Women's Clubs, founded in 1919, at a meeting led by Lena Madesin Phillips of Kentucky. In the 1930s it became a charter member of the International Federation of Business and Professional Women.
- National Plant, Flower and Fruit Guild, founded by 1895 (was this a women's organization?)
- National Society of the Colonial Dames of America (NSCDA), founded 1891, distinct from CDA formed just prior
- National Society United States Daughters of 1812, founded in 1892 as "United States Daughters of 1812"
- Navy Wives Clubs of America, founded 1936 in California
- Northeastern Federation of Colored Women's Clubs, founded 1896, first umbrella organization for black women's clubs in the United States, went back and forth in affiliating with NACWC, had 55 clubs in northeastern U.S. in early 1900s, was incorporated in 1927
- Phillis Wheatley Club, African Americans' women's clubs, started in 1895 in Nashville, TN, also in Florida, Illinois, Louisiana, New York, Ohio, Texas, Wisconsin and elsewhere
- Pulpwood Queens, founded in 2000 in Jefferson, Texas; reportedly has 400 chapters, including 10 in foreign countries and one in a women's prison
- United Daughters of the Confederacy, founded in 1894 in Nashville, Tennessee
- United Order of Tents, founded in Virginia, a secret society for African American churchwomen
- Women's Health Protective Association, founded as the "Ladies' Health Protective Association" in 1884 in New York City, had 40 clubs from various cities at its 1897 convention in Philadelphia.
- Yesharah Society, founded 1928, a social organization of female returned missionaries of the Church of Jesus Christ of Latter-day Saints. Had multiple chapters, peaked in 1950s (perhaps most numerous within Utah?)

==== Alabama ====
In 1922, the Alabama Federation of Women’s Clubs had 219 clubs with about 6,000 members, not counting "Colored" / African-American women's clubs.

Clubs in the state have included:

- Alabama's Colored Women's Club
- Mobile Business Women's Club, whose 1912 building in Fairhope, Alabama was listed on the NRHP in 2018 as American Legion Post 199.
- Woman's Club of Perdue Hill, Perdue Hill, Alabama

==== Alaska ====
In 1922 the Alaska Federation of Women's Clubs had 9 clubs with about 427 members.

- Anchorage Woman's Club

==== Arizona ====
In 1922 the Arizona State Federation of Women's Clubs had 53 clubs with about 3,515 members. In 1932, the Arizona Republic listed 66 federated clubs throughout the state.

- Coolidge Woman's Club, Coolidge, AZ, NRHP-listed
- Mesa Woman's Club, Mesa, AZ, NRHP-listed
- Tempe Woman's Club, Tempe, AZ, NRHP-listed
- Willcox Women's Club, Willcox, AZ, NRHP-listed
- Woman's Club, Safford, AZ, NRHP-listed

==== Arkansas ====
In 1922 the Arkansas Federation of Women's Clubs, organized in 1897, had 250 clubs with about 8,000 members.

- The Aesthetic Club, a women's literary club formed on 16 January 1883 in Little Rock, founded by Mary Eliza Knapp and others
- Woman's Community Club Band Shell, Heber Springs, Arkansas, NRHP-listed
- Woman's Progressive Club, Wynne, AR, NRHP-listed

==== California ====
In 1922 the California State Federation of Women's Clubs, organized in 1900, had 531 clubs with about 55,624 members.

Clubs in the state have included:

- Berkeley City Club
- Berkeley Women's City Club, Berkeley, California, NRHP-listed
- Beverly Hills Women's Club, Beverly Hills, CA, NRHP-listed
- California Federation of Business & Professional Women's Clubs
- California State Federation of Colored Women's Clubs
- College Women's Club, Berkeley, CA, NRHP-listed
- Ebell Club of Santa Paula, Santa Paula, CA, NRHP-listed
- Ebell of Los Angeles, Los Angeles, CA, NRHP-listed
- Ebell of Long Beach, founded 1896; Pearl Jane Pearson Brison was involved
- Ebell Society, founded in 1876 in Oakland as the International Academy for the Advancement of Women. The club's purpose was the advancement of women in cultural, industrial and intellectual pursuits.
- Francisca Club, private women's club in San Francisco
- Friday Morning Club, Los Angeles, founded 1891. Its second clubhouse building, built in 1923, is NRHP-listed
- Hollywood Women's Press Club, Los Angeles, founded 1928, no longer extant
- Girls Club (San Francisco)
- La Jolla Woman's Club, La Jolla, CA, NRHP-listed
- La Puente Valley Woman's Club, La Puente, CA, NRHP-listed
- Los Angeles Nurses' Club
- Maywood Woman's Club, 902 Marin St. Corning, CA (associated with Edward Gardner Lewis's scheme), NRHP-listed
- Montebello Woman's Club, Montebello, CA, NRHP-listed
- Philomathean Clubhouse, Stockton, CA, NRHP-listed
- San Pedro Woman's Club, San Pedro, CA
- San Rafael Improvement Club, founded 1902, a civic improvement organization whose clubhouse is listed on the NRHP. It may or may not have defined itself as a club for women, but photos show it was.
- Santa Clara Women's Club Adobe, California Historical Landmark
- Sausalito Woman's Club, Sausalito, CA, NRHP-listed
- Wilfandel Club, founded 1945, oldest African American women's club in Los Angeles
- Women's Athletic Club of Alameda County, Oakland, CA, NRHP-listed, whose NRHP doc also gives info about:
- Woman's Athletic Club of San Francisco, San Francisco, CA, NRHP-listed

- Woman's Athletic Club of San Francisco (1914), 640 Sutter St.
- Women's Club of San Francisco (1927), also on Sutter Street
- Women's Athletic Club of Los Angeles (1924)
- Women's City Club of Oakland (1927–1928), 1428 Alice Street
- Berkeley Women's City Club (1929–1930), 2315 Durant Avenue

- Woman's Building (Los Angeles), a "feminist mecca" during 1973 to 1991, a non-profit arts and education center (is this fairly categorized as a women's club?)
- Woman's Club of Hollywood, Hollywood, Los Angeles, CA, NRHP-listed
- Woman's Club of Lincoln, Lincoln, CA, NRHP-listed
- Woman's Club of Lodi, Lodi, CA, NRHP-listed
- Woman's Improvement Club Clubhouse, Corona, CA, NRHP-listed
- Women's Improvement Club of Hueneme, Port Hueneme, CA, NRHP-listed
- Woman's Club of Redondo Beach, Redondo Beach, CA, NRHP-listed

==== Colorado ====
In 1922 the Colorado Federation of Women's Clubs, organized in 1895, total membership was not reported, but 28 clubs were listed in Winslow's directory.

- Colorado Federation of Women's Clubs
- T.M. Callahan House, Longmont, listed on the National Register

==== Connecticut ====
In 1922 the Connecticut Federation of Women's Clubs had 80 clubs with about 7,000 members.

==== Delaware ====
In 1922 the Delaware Federation of Women's Clubs had 38 clubs with more than 3,000 members.

- Delaware Children's Theatre
- Woman's Club of Newport, Newport, DE, NRHP-listed

==== Florida ====
See also List of Woman's Clubhouses in Florida on the National Register of Historic Places

In 1922 the Florida Federation of Women's Clubs, organized in 1895, had 180 clubs with about 10,500 members.

- Babson Park Woman's Club, Babson Park, FL, NRHP-listed
- Bee Ridge Woman's Club, Sarasota, FL, NRHP-listed
- Boynton Woman's Club, Boynton Beach, FL, NRHP-listed
- Bradenton Woman's Club, Bradenton, FL, NRHP-listed
- Clermont Woman's Club, Clermont, FL, NRHP-listed
- Coco Plum Woman's Club, Coral Gables, FL, NRHP-listed
- Coral Gables Woman's Club, Coral Gables, FL, NRHP-listed
- Dade City Woman's Club, Dade City, FL, NRHP-listed
- Davie Woman's Club, Davie, FL, NRHP-listed
- Everglades Women's Club, Everglades City, in 1965 took home in NRHP-listed Everglades Laundry
- Hollywood Woman's Club, Hollywood, FL, NRHP-listed
- Lake Butler Woman's Club, Lake Butler, FL, NRHP-listed
- Lemon Bay Woman's Club, Englewood, FL, NRHP-listed
- Lloyd Woman's Club, Lloyd, FL, NRHP-listed
- Melrose Woman's Club, Melrose, FL, NRHP-listed
- Miami Women's Club, Miami, FL, NRHP-listed
- Ormond Beach Woman's Club, Ormond Beach, FL, NRHP-listed
- Punta Gorda Woman's Club, Punta Gorda, FL, NRHP-listed
- Quincy Woman's Club, Quincy, FL, NRHP-listed
- St. Petersburg Woman's Club, St. Petersburg, FL, NRHP-listed
- Sarasota Woman's Club, Sarasota, FL, NRHP-listed
- Terra Ceia Woman's Club, Terra Ceia, FL, NRHP-listed, also known as "Terra Ceia Village Improvement Association Hall"
- Vero Beach Woman's Club, Vero Beach, FL, NRHP-listed
- Woman's Club of Chipley, Chipley, FL, NRHP-listed
- Women's Club of Coconut Grove, Miami, FL, NRHP-listed
- Woman's Club of Eustis, Eustis, FL, NRHP-listed
- Woman's Club of Jacksonville, Jacksonville, FL, NRHP-listed
- Woman's Club of New Smyrna, New Smyrna Beach, FL, NRHP-listed
- Woman's Club of Palmetto, Palmetto, FL, NRHP-listed
- Woman's Club of Starke, Starke, FL, NRHP-listed
- Woman's Club of Tallahassee, Tallahassee, FL, NRHP-listed
- Woman's Club of Winter Haven, Winter Haven, FL, NRHP-listed
- Woman's Club of Winter Park, Winter Park, FL, NRHP-listed

==== Georgia ====
In 1922 the Georgia State Federation of Women's Clubs, organized in 1896, had 350 clubs with about 33,000 members.

- Atlanta Neighborhood Union
- Atlanta Women's Club, Atlanta, GA, NRHP-listed
- Dawson Woman's Clubhouse, Dawson, GA, NRHP-listed
- Demorest Women's Club, Demorest, GA, NRHP-listed
- Lyons Woman's Club House, Lyons, GA, NRHP-listed
- Rockmart Woman's Club, Rockmart, GA, NRHP-listed
- Tennille Woman's Clubhouse, Tennille, GA, NRHP-listed
- Women's Political Council, Montgomery

==== Hawaii ====
- Hilo Woman’s Club (1921)
- Soroptimist International of Kona (1971)
- Women's Campus Club, established in 1920, grew from 1908-founded "Women's Club of the College of Hawaii"
- Zonta International (1951)

==== Idaho ====
In 1922 the Idaho Federation of Women's Clubs, organized in 1905, had 109 clubs with about 5,000 members.

- American Women's League Chapter House (Peck, Idaho), 217 N. Main St. Peck, ID (associated with Edward Gardner Lewis's scheme), NRHP-listed
- Portia Club, in Payette, Idaho, was organized in 1895, joined Idaho Federation in 1904, built clubhouse 1927, NRHP-listed

==== Illinois ====
In 1922 the Illinois Federation of Women's Clubs, organized in 1892, had 584 clubs with about 66,963 members, not including any African-American women's clubs.

Clubs in the state have included:

- Alpha Suffrage Club, black female suffrage club founded in 1913, based in Chicago
- Alton Chapter House (built 1909), 509 Beacon St. Alton, IL (associated with Edward Gardner Lewis's scheme), NRHP-listed
- Andover Chapter House, Locust St., NW Andover, IL (associated with Edward Gardner Lewis's scheme), NRHP-listed
- Annawan Chapter House, 206 S. Depot St. Annawan, IL (associated with Edward Gardner Lewis's scheme), NRHP-listed
- Carlinville Chapter House, 111 S. Charles St. Carlinville, IL (associated with Edward Gardner Lewis's scheme), NRHP-listed
- Chicago and Northern District Association of Colored Women's Clubs
- Chicago Woman's Club
- Edwardsville Chapter House, 515 W. High St. Edwardsville, IL (associated with Edward Gardner Lewis's scheme), NRHP-listed
- Fortnightly of Chicago, founded 1873
- Frederick Douglass Woman's Club, Chicago, founded in 1906, one of the first women's clubs in Chicago to promote suffrage, and one of few interracial women's clubs in Chicago. Mostly middle-class. Pressured the Chicago Political League, another local woman's club to extend their membership to African-American women.
- Marine Chapter House, Silver St. Marine, IL (associated with Edward Gardner Lewis's scheme), NRHP-listed
- Princeton Chapter House, 1007 N. Main St. Princeton, IL (associated with Edward Gardner Lewis's scheme), NRHP-listed
- Queen Isabella Association, organized in Chicago in 1889 with purpose to create a statue of Spanish queen Isabella in the 1893 World's Columbian Exposition, it expanded to chapters in New York, St. Louis, and Washington D.C. as well, attempting to become a national organization
- Three Arts Club of Chicago
- Woman's Athletic Club, Chicago, founded in 1898, the first athletic club for women in the United States.
- The Woman's Building (Chicago) was organized also for the 1893 World's Columbian Exposition (not a club?)
- Woman's Club of Evanston, Evanston, IL, NRHP-listed
- Zion Chapter House, 2715 Emmaus Ave. Zion, IL (associated with Edward Gardner Lewis's scheme), NRHP-listed

==== Indiana ====
In 1922 the Federation of Women's Clubs, organized in 1890–1900, had 517 clubs with about 23,269 members, not including any African-American women's clubs.

- Indiana State Federation of Colored Women's Clubs, Indianapolis, NRHP-listed
- The Propylaeum (John W. Schmidt House), Indianapolis, NRHP-listed
- Vincennes Fortnightly Club, Vincennes, Indiana, NRHP-listed
- Woman's Improvement Club (Indianapolis), Indianapolis, Indiana

==== Iowa ====
In 1922 the Iowa Federation of Women's Clubs, organized in 1893, had 806 clubs with about 40,485 members, not including any African-American women's clubs.

- Des Moines Women's Club, founded in 1885, Hoyt Sherman Place NRHP listed
- Iowa Federation of Colored Women's Clubs

==== Kansas ====
In 1922 the Kansas Federation of Women's Clubs, organized in 1895–1904, had 397 clubs with about 10,034 members, not including any African-American women's clubs.

Clubs in the state have included:

- Topeka Council of Colored Women's Clubs Building, Topeka, KS, NRHP-listed
- Woman's Club Building, Topeka, KS, NRHP-listed
- Woman's Club House, 900 Poyntz Ave., Manhattan, Kansas (associated with Edward Gardner Lewis's scheme), NRHP-listed

==== Kentucky ====
In 1922 the Kentucky State Federation of Women's Clubs, organized in 1894, had 154 clubs with about 10,000 members, not including any African-American women's clubs.

Clubs in the state have included:

- Business Women's Club, Louisville, Kentucky, NRHP-listed
- Hodgenville Women's Club, Hodgenville, Kentucky, organized in 1919; its 1934 building is NRHP-listed
- Kentucky Federation of Women's Clubs, founded 1894, affiliated with GFWC

==== Louisiana ====
The Louisiana Federation of Women's Clubs was organized in 1899. The 1922 directory listed 25 clubs, not including any African-American women's clubs.

Clubs in the state have included:

- Era Club of New Orleans, founded 1896
- Krewe of Muses, New Orleans, founded in 2000
- Tallulah Book Club Building, Tallulah, Louisiana, NRHP-listed

==== Maine ====
In 1922 the Maine Federation of Women's Clubs had 147 clubs with about 6,500 members.

==== Maryland ====
In 1922 the Maryland Federation of Women's Clubs, organized in 1900, had 84 clubs with about 12,000 members, not including any African-American women's clubs.

Clubs in the state have included:

- Woman's Literary Club of Baltimore

==== Massachusetts ====
In 1922 the Massachusetts Federation of Women's Clubs had 324 clubs with about 126,128 members.

- Belmont Woman's Club, organized in 1920
- Chilton Club, Back Bay area of Boston, founded in 1910
- The College Club of Boston
- Colored Female Religious and Moral Society, Salem, MA, organized in 1818
- Ladies Physiological Institute, Boston, asserted to be first women's club in U.S. (needs qualification), founded in 1848
- New England Woman's Press Association, Boston, founded 1885
- New England Women's Club, Boston, founded 1868, nearly tied with Sorosis in NYC as first professional(?) women's club in the U.S.
- Saturday Morning Club, Boston, founded in 1871 by Julia Ward Howe
- Saturday Evening Girls club (1899–1969), Boston, operated The Paul Revere Pottery
- Woman's Club of Fall River, Fall River, Massachusetts, NRHP-listed
- Women's City Club of Boston
- Woman's Era Club, Boston, founded c. 1892–94, first black women's club in Boston, attempted to desegregate GFWC in 1900.

==== Michigan ====
In 1922 the Michigan State Federation of Women's Clubs, organized in 1895, had 423 clubs with about 50,567 members, not including any African-American women's clubs.

- Women's City Club, Detroit, Michigan, NRHP-listed
- Detroit Study Club, founded 1896, black women's literary organization also involved in social issues and community welfare
- Kappa Eta Kappa, Richmond, Michigan, organized in 1903 and renamed the Richmond Woman's Club in 1921
- Lansing Woman's Club Building, Lansing, Michigan, NRHP-listed
- Ladies' Library Association of Kalamazoo
- Ladies' Literary Club Building, Ypsilanti, Michigan

==== Minnesota ====
In 1922 the Minnesota State Federation of Women's Clubs, organized in 1895, had 601 clubs with about 48,153 members, not including any African-American women's clubs.

- Saint Paul Women's City Club, St. Paul, Minnesota, NRHP-listed
- Woman's Club of Minneapolis, Minneapolis, Minnesota, NRHP-listed

==== Mississippi ====
In 1922 the Mississippi State Federation of Women's Clubs, organized in 1898, had 147 clubs with about 5,000 members, not including any African-American women's clubs.

- Mississippi Federation of Women's Clubs, Jackson, Mississippi, NRHP-listed
- Mississippi State Federation of Colored Women’s Clubs

==== Missouri ====
In 1922 the Missouri Federation of Women's Clubs, organized in 1896, had 306 clubs with about 20,000 members, not including any African-American women's clubs.

==== Montana ====
In 1922 the Montana Federation of Women's Clubs, organized in 1904, had 103 clubs with about 5,000 members, not including any African-American women's clubs.

Clubs in Montana have included:

- Deer Lodge American Women's League Chapter House, 802 Missouri Ave. Deer Lodge, Montana (associated with Edward Gardner Lewis's scheme), NRHP-listed
- Glacier Park Women's Club, East Glacier, Montana, founded 1920, NRHP-listed
- Thompson Falls Women's Club, Thompson Falls, Montana, founded 1914, NRHP-listed

==== Nebraska ====
In 1922 the Nebraska Federation of Women's Clubs, organized in 1895, had 275 clubs with about 14,000 members, not including any African-American women's clubs.

==== Nevada ====
In 1922 the Nevada State Federation of Women's Clubs, organized in 1908, had 32 clubs with about 10,000 members, not including any African-American women's clubs.

Clubs in Nevada have included:

- 20th Century Club (Reno, Nevada), club organized in 1894; building built in 1925, NRHP-listed

==== New Hampshire ====
In 1922 the New Hampshire Federation of Women's Clubs had 126 clubs with about 11,730 members.

==== New Jersey ====
In 1922 the New Jersey State Federation of Women's Clubs had 232 clubs with about 35,000 members.

- New Jersey State Federation of Women's Clubs
- Kalmia Club, Lambertville, NJ, NRHP-listed
- Woman's Club of Englewood, NJ, NRHP-listed
- Woman's Club of Red Bank, NJ, NRHP-listed
- Woman's Club of Rutherford, NJ, NRHP-listed
- Woman's Club of Upper Montclair, NJ, NRHP-listed

See also NJ clubhouses MRA/MPS doc.

==== New Mexico ====
In 1922 the New Mexico Federation of Women's Clubs, organized in 1911, had 50 clubs with about 2,000 members, not including any African-American women's clubs.

Clubs in New Mexico have included:

- Alamogordo Woman's Club, Alamogordo, NM, NRHP-listed
- Carrizozo Woman's Club, Carrizozo, NM, NRHP-listed
- Silver City Woman's Club, Silver City, NM, NRHP-listed
- Woman's Improvement Association of Las Cruces, founded in 1894

==== New York ====
In 1922 the New York State Federation of Women's Clubs, organized in 1894, had about 500 clubs with about 300,000 members.

- Belizean Grove, NYC, founded 1999
- Bronxville Women's Club, Bronxville, NY, NRHP-listed
- Brooklyn Women's Club, founded in 1869
- Colony Club, New York City, founded 1903; its former building, the Old Colony Club, is NRHP-listed
- Cosmopolitan Club (New York City)
- Empire State Federation of Women's Clubs
- Equal Suffrage League (Brooklyn)
- Hroswitha Club (1944–1999) a club of women bibliophiles, all excluded (until 1976) from the men's Grolier Club and the Caxton Club.) It met first at the Cosmopolitan Club (New York City) (a women's club) and met four to five times a year at multiple locations. Membership was capped at 40 members by the 1950s; members included Ruth S. Granniss, who was librarian to the Grolier Club.
- Jamaica Women's Club, Jamaica, Queens
- Manor Club, Pelham Manor
- Mount Vernon Hotel Museum, headquarters of Colonial Dames of America which purchased it in 1924
- New Century Club (Utica, New York), NRHP-listed
- Scarsdale Woman's Club, Scarsdale, NY, NRHP-listed
- Sorosis, NYC, founded 1868, first professional women's club in U.S.
- Twentieth Century Club, Buffalo, founded 1894
- Women's City Club of New York (WCC)
- Women's Community Club of South Valley, South Valley, NY, NRHP-listed
- Women's National Republican Club, NYC, founded in 1921; its 1934 building is NRHP-listed
- Woman's Press Club of New York City

==== North Carolina ====
In 1922 the North Carolina State Federation of Women's Clubs, organized in 1902, had 196 clubs with about 10,000 members, not including any African-American women's clubs.

Clubs in North Carolina have included"

- Charlotte Woman's Club, asserted to be the oldest civic organization in Charlotte, North Carolina. It established the first kindergarten in the city, staffed city buses and the Southern Railway station with volunteers during both World Wars. They were also involved with organizing the YWCA, PTA and Traveler's Aid in Charlotte. They also brought the first public health nurses to Charlotte and helped create the League of Women Voters. The CWC also supported the creation of the Mint Museum of Art and the Domestic Relations Court.
- Fayetteville Women's Club and Oval Ballroom, Fayetteville, NC, NRHP-listed
- Fuquay-Varina Woman's Club Clubhouse, Fuquay-Varina, NC, NRHP-listed
- Woman's Club of Fayetteville, Fayetteville, NC, founded in 1906 as a Civic Improvement Association to fight for preservation of historic Market House, not named a Women's Club until 1920. Established first public library in Fayetteville, continues to work for historic preservation.

==== North Dakota ====
In 1922 the North Dakota Federation of Women's Clubs, organized in 1897, had 188 clubs with about 4,500 members, not including any African-American women's clubs.

==== Ohio ====
In 1922 the Ohio State Federation of Women's Clubs, organized in 1894, had 603 clubs with about 85,000 members, not including any African-American women's clubs.

Ohio clubs have included:

- Cincinnati Federation of Colored Women's Clubs, owns, since 1925, the NRHP-listed C. H. Burroughs House
- Dayton Women's Club (1916), Dayton, OH, NRHP-listed
- Mansfield Woman's Club, Mansfield, OH, NRHP-listed

==== Oklahoma ====
In 1922 the Oklahoma State Federation of Women's Clubs, organized in 1898, had 225 clubs with about 10,000 members, not including any African-American women's clubs.

- Federation of Women's Clubs for Oklahoma and Indian Territories
- Oklahoma Federation of Colored Women's Clubs

==== Oregon ====
In 1922 the Oregon State Federation of Women's Clubs, organized in 1889, had 119 clubs with about 8,000 members, not including any African-American women's clubs.

Oregon clubs have included:

- Dundee Woman's Club Hall, Dundee, OR, NRHP-listed
- The Town Club, Portland, OR, NRHP-listed

==== Pennsylvania ====
In 1922 the Pennsylvania State Federation of Women's Clubs, organized in 1895, had 233 clubs with about 57,180 members, not including any African-American women's clubs.

Pennsylvania clubs have included:

- Charlotte Cushman Club and Library, Philadelphia, established in 1907, closed in 1999.
- Cosmopolitan Club of Philadelphia
- The Plastic Club, Philadelphia, founded 1897
- Saturday Club (Wayne, Pennsylvania)
- Woman's Club of Warren, Warren, PA, NRHP-listed

==== Rhode Island ====
In 1922 the Rhode Island Federation of Women's Clubs had 42 clubs with about 2,220 members.

==== South Carolina ====
In 1922 the South Carolina State Federation of Women's Clubs, organized in 1898, had 182 clubs with about 6,509 members, not including any African-American women's clubs.

South Carolina clubs have included:

- General Federation of Women’s Clubs of South Carolina
- South Carolina Federation of Colored Women's Clubs (SCRCWC)

==== South Dakota ====
In 1922 the South Dakota State Federation of Women's Clubs, organized in 1900, had 132 clubs with about 4,181 members, not including any African-American women's clubs.

==== Tennessee ====
In 1922 the Tennessee Federation of Women's Clubs, organized in 1899, had 120 clubs with about 8,000 members, not including any African-American women's clubs.

Tennessee clubs included:

- Country Woman's Club, Clarksville, TN, NRHP-listed
- Ladies Rest Room, Lewisburg, NRHP-listed. Built by the Marshall County court in 1924 as a place for rural women to relax, rest, and eat during their visits to Lewisburg, the county seat. During the 1910s and 1920s, there was widespread encouragement in the United States for the establishment of ladies' lounges and rest rooms to accommodate rural women.
- Ossoli Circle, Knoxville, founded in 1885 as a literary society; the Ossoli Circle Clubhouse (1933) is NRHP-listed
- The Nineteenth Century Club, Memphis

==== Texas ====
In 1922 the Texas Federation of Women's Clubs, organized in 1897, had 450 clubs with about 25,000 members, not including any African-American women's clubs.

Texas clubs have included:

- The Euterpean Club, Fort Worth, founded 1896
- Houston Heights Woman's Club, Houston, TX, NRHP-listed
- Lyceum Club (Dallas)
- Port Arthur Federated Women's Clubhouse, Port Arthur, TX, NRHP-listed
- Texas Association of Women's Clubs, African American women, founded in 1905 to serve African Americans who were excluded from Texas Federation of Women's Clubs
- Texas Equal Rights Association
- Texas Equal Suffrage Association
- Texas Federation of Women's Clubs, created 70 percent of public libraries in Texas
- Texas Federation of Women's Clubs Headquarters, Austin, TX, NRHP-listed
- Woman's Club of Beaumont Clubhouse, Beaumont, TX, NRHP-listed
- Women's Club of El Paso, El Paso. Originated in 1894, achieved building in 1916, NRHP-listed
- The Woman's Club of Fort Worth
- Woman's Club of San Antonio

See also: Pulpwood Queens, founded in Texas, with multiple locations elsewhere in U.S. and internationally.

==== Utah ====
In 1922 the Utah Federation of Women's Clubs, organized in 1893, had 72 clubs with about 3,500 members, not including any African-American women's clubs.

Utah clubs have included:

- Ladies Literary Club Clubhouse, Salt Lake City, Utah, NRHP-listed

==== Vermont ====
In 1922 the Vermont Federation of Women's Clubs had 67 clubs with about 6,383 members.

==== Virginia ====
In 1922 the Virginia State Federation of Women's Clubs, organized in 1907, had 80 clubs with about 1,600 members, not including any African-American women's clubs.

- Gloucester Women's Club, Gloucester, VA, NRHP-listed
- Middlesex County Woman's Club, Urbanna, VA, a colonial era county courthouse building that has been headquarters of the club since 1948, NRHP-listed
- Mount Vernon Ladies' Association, preserves the George Washington's estate in Mount Vernon, Virginia. Founded in 1853 with South Carolina and wider association of Southern ladies.
- Woman's Civic Betterment Club, Roanoke, founded 1907, aimed to improve sanitation

==== Washington ====
In 1922 the Federation of Women's Clubs, organized in 1896, had 241 clubs with about 27,000 members, not including any African-American women's clubs.

- Kirkland Woman's Club, Kirkland, WA, NRHP-listed
- Longview Women's Clubhouse, Longview, WA, NRHP-listed
- Woman's Club of Olympia, Olympia, WA, NRHP-listed
- Women's University Club of Seattle, Seattle, WA, NRHP-listed

==== Washington, D.C. ====
In 1922 the District of Columbia Federation of Women's Clubs, organized in 1894, had 30 clubs with about 8,000 members.

- Dumbarton House, headquarters of National Society of the Colonial Dames of America, was purchased iby the NSCDA in 1928, and is NRHP-listed.
- General Federation of Women's Clubs Headquarters, Washington, D.C., built 1875, has served as headquarters of the GWFC since 1922, NRHP-listed.
- Sulgrave Club, Washington, D.C., NRHP-listed.
- United States Daughters of 1812, National Headquarters, Washington, D.C., purchased in 1928 by the United States Daughters of 1812, is NRHP-listed.
- Whittemore House, Washington, D.C., clubhouse of the Woman's National Democratic Club, NRHP-listed.
- Women's City Club of Washington, D.C.

==== West Virginia ====
In 1922 the West Virginia State Federation of Women's Clubs, organized in 1904, had 78 clubs with about 5,000 members, not including any African-American women's clubs.

West Virginia clubs have included:

- Parkersburg Women's Club, Parkersburg, NRHP-listed
- Woman's Club of Fairmont, Fairmont, clubhouse in historic Thomas and Annie Fleming mansion, NRHP-listed

==== Wisconsin ====
In 1922 the Federation of Women's Clubs, organized in 1896, had 312 clubs with about 20,000 members, not including any African-American women's clubs.

Wisconsin clubs have included:

- Wauwatosa Woman's Club, Wauwatosa, WI, NRHP-listed
- Woman's Club of Wisconsin, Milwaukee, WI, NRHP-listed

==== Wyoming ====
In 1922 the Wyoming Federation of Women's Clubs, organized in 1904, had 62 clubs with about 2,000 members, not including any African-American women's clubs.

- Casper Women's Club House, Casper, NRHP-listed

==== U.S. Territories ====
===== Guam =====
- Guam Women’s Club (founded 1952), asserted to be the first women’s organization on Guam.
- International Women's Club of Guam (founded 1973)

===== Puerto Rico =====
See National Conference of Puerto Rican Women (founded in 1972 in Washington, D.C.)

== See also ==
- Category:Clubwomen
- List of YWCA buildings
- List of Woman's Clubhouses in Florida on the U.S. National Register of Historic Places
- List of traditional gentlemen's clubs in the United States
- Woman's club movement
- List of women's association football clubs
- Home Demonstration Clubs
