= Saturday Club =

Saturday Club may refer to:

- Saturday Club (BBC Radio), a 1957–1969 British pop music programme
- Saturday Club (TV series), an Australian children's program
- Saturday Club (Boston, Massachusetts), an American 19th-century informal monthly gathering of writers and academics
- Saturday Club (Wayne, Pennsylvania), a historic American women's club building
- Saturday Club (Kolkata), a club established in India in 1875
