= Woman's Athletic Club =

Coordinates: 41.89357°N 87.62461°W

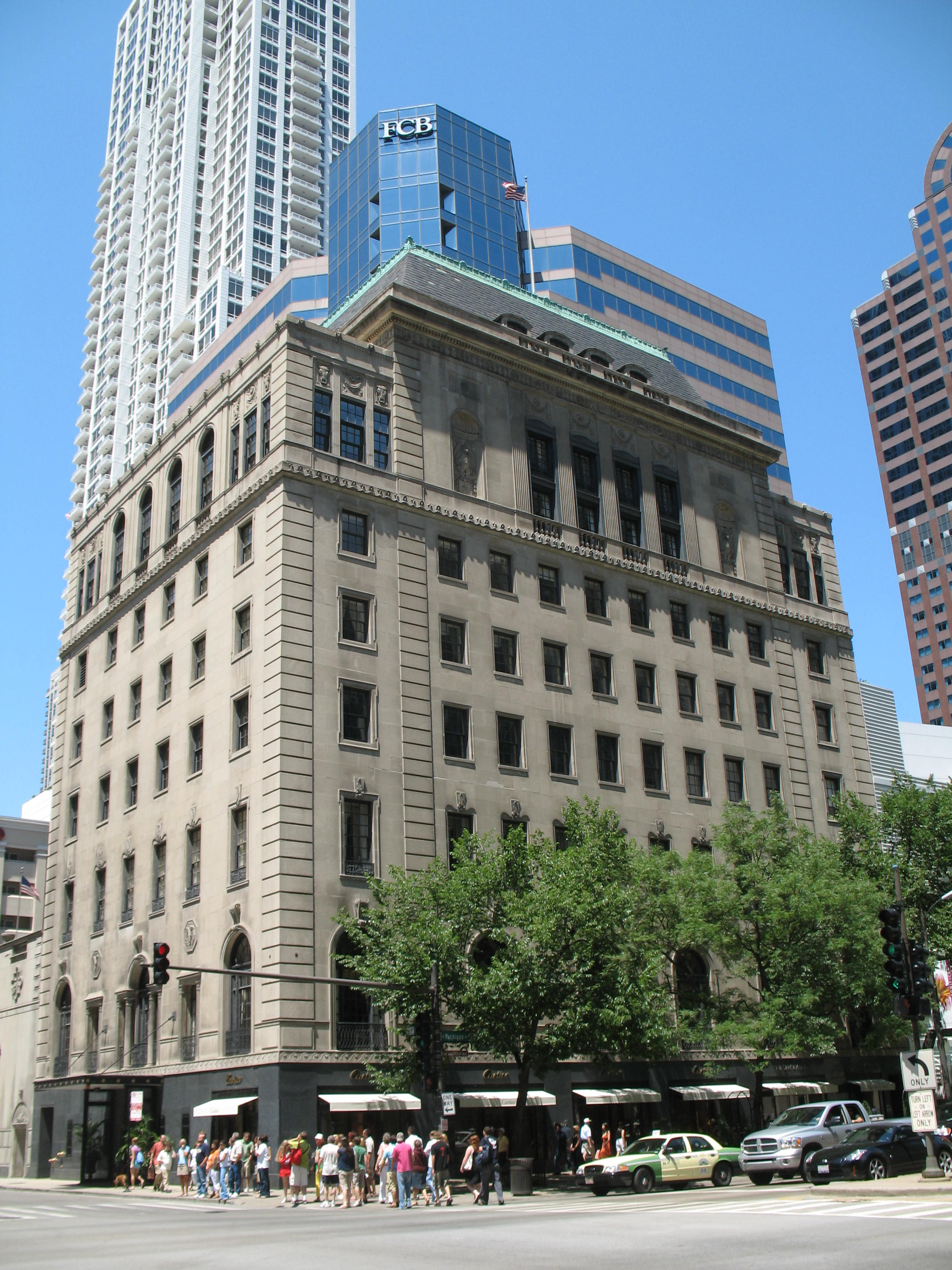
This building now has Magnificent Mile locations of Cartier and Van Cleef & Arpels at the street level.

Woman's Athletic Club is a historic building located along the Magnificent Mile in the Near North Side community area of Chicago, Illinois. Founded in 1898, it is the home of the first athletic club for women in the United States. It was named a Chicago Landmark on October 2, 1991.

== See also ==
- List of women's clubs
- List of Chicago Landmarks
- Woman's Athletic Club of San Francisco
- Women's Athletic Club of Alameda County
