= Woman's Club of Topeka =

- Woman's Club Building
- U.S. National Register of Historic Places
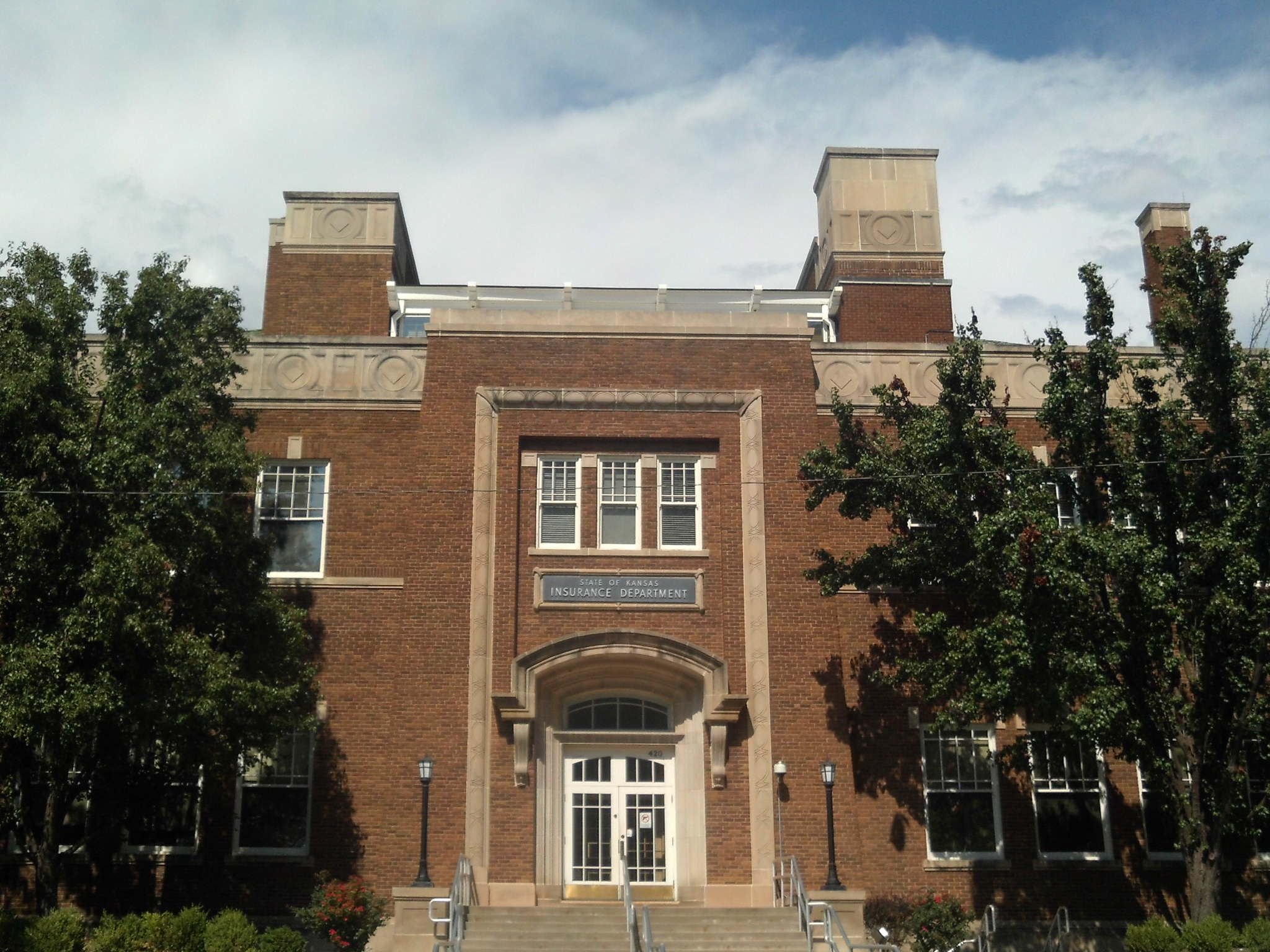

- Location within Kansas
- Location: 420 W. 9th St., Topeka, Kansas
- Coordinates: 39°02′45″N 95°40′32″W
- Area: 1 acre (0.40 ha)
- Built: 1923–25
- Built by: Leeper, J.M. Leeper, contractor
- Architect: Frank C. Squires
- Architectural style: Free Eclectic
- NRHP reference No.: 82002676
- Added to NRHP: February 19, 1982

The Woman's Club of Topeka was named as an entity in 1916 but has earlier roots. Its building, located just one-half block west of the Kansas State Capitol and completed in 1925, was listed on the National Register of Historic Places in 1982.

A federation of women's clubs in Topeka and its area was formed in 1897, and became the Topeka Federation of Women in 1912. It "promoted other forms of musical education and entertainment", donated pictures and statues to local schools, donated books and magazines to various institutions, and sought to introduce domestic science and manual arts training into public schools' curricula.

In 1903, after a flood (the Heppner flood of 1903 in Oregon?), the club raised funds for disaster relief. During World War I it supported the war effort in various ways.

The Woman's Club Building, also known as The Clubhouse of the Woman's Club of Topeka, at 420 W. 9th St. in Topeka, Kansas was built during 1923–25. It is a three-story brick building with cut stone trim and is 90 by 100 feet (27 m × 30 m) in plan.

== See also ==
- Topeka Council of Colored Women's Clubs Building, also NRHP-listed
