= Woman's Club of Englewood =

- U.S. National Register of Historic Places
- New Jersey Register of Historic Places
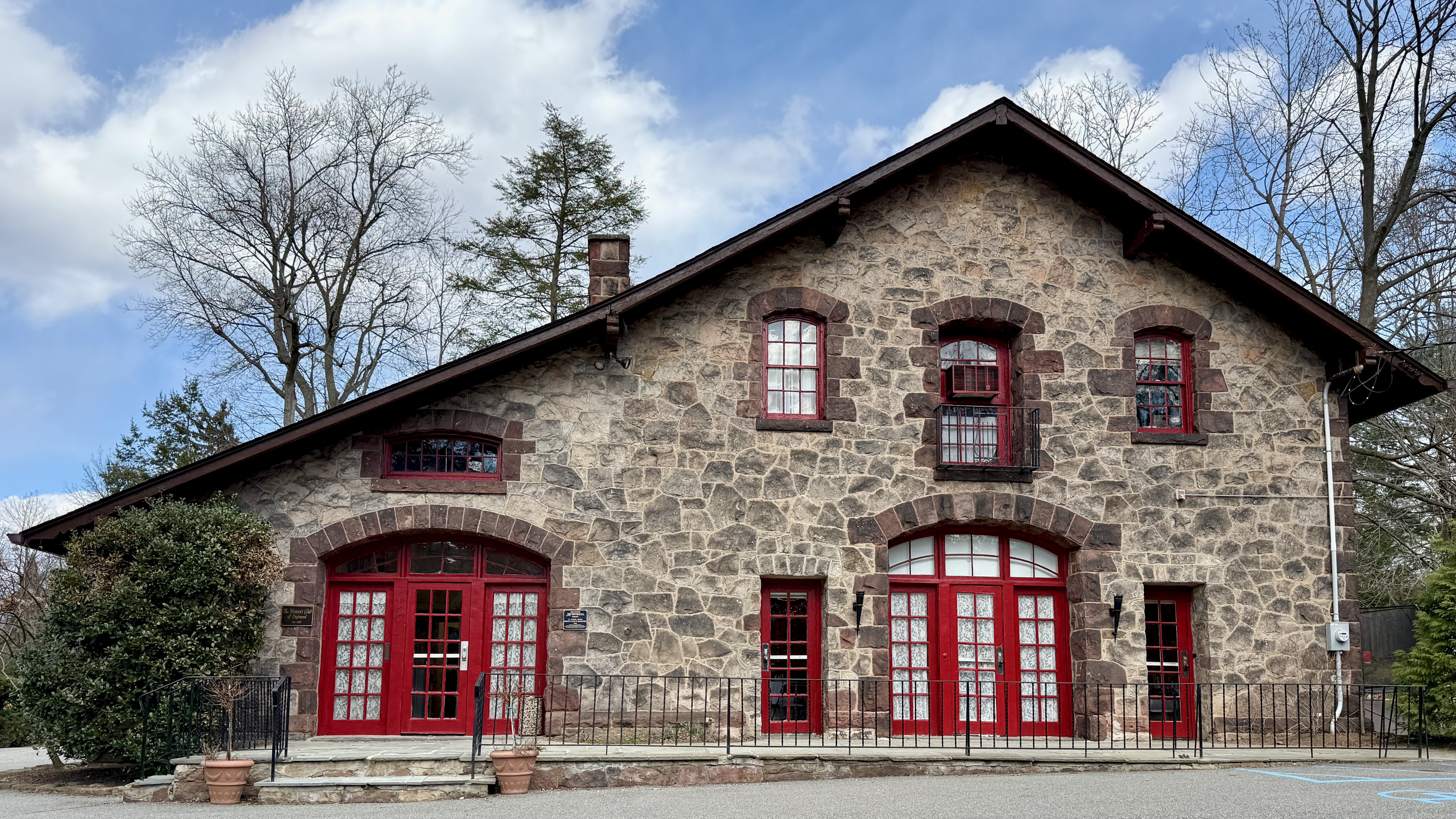

- Location within Bergen County, New Jersey Location within New Jersey Location within the United States
- Location: 187 Brinckerhoff Court, Englewood, New Jersey
- Coordinates: 40°53′27.7″N 73°58′0.5″W
- MPS: Clubhouses of New Jersey Women's Clubs
- NRHP reference No.: 100012317
- NJRHP No.: 5780

Significant dates
- Added to NRHP: September 29, 2025
- Designated NJRHP: August 26, 2025

The Woman's Club of Englewood is a women's club started in 1895 in the city of Englewood in Bergen County, New Jersey, United States. Their clubhouse, also known as the Brinckerhoff Carriage House, is located at 187 Brinckerhoff Court. Featuring brownstone, it was added to the National Register of Historic Places on September 29, 2025, for its significance in architecture and social history. It was listed as part of the Clubhouses of New Jersey Women's Clubs Multiple Property Submission (MPS).

== History and description ==
The club house was built as a carriage house for an estate owned by J. Wyman Jones, who had developed Englewood as a railroad suburb. He later subdivided the estate and sold this section to Emily Brinckerhoff. Her husband, Elbert Adrain Brinckerhoff, was major of the city. They enlarged the carriage house and converted it for use by automobiles by 1915. After their deaths, the Englewood Conservatory of Music turned the building into a music and dance school. It closed during the Great Depression and the Woman's Club of Englewood purchased the building in 1936 for use as their clubhouse.

== See also ==
- List of women's clubs
- National Register of Historic Places listings in Bergen County, New Jersey
