= Francisca Club =

The Francisca Club is a women's only private social club at 595 Sutter Street in San Francisco, California. It is apparently the oldest private women's club surviving in San Francisco and has been in its clubhouse since the 1920s. It had typically had a membership of around 500; however, recently this has declined to closer to 400.

Other women's clubs in San Francisco were the Woman's Athletic Club of San Francisco, whose 640 Sutter St. building was built in 1914, and the Women's Club of San Francisco, whose Sutter Street building was built in 1927. The Sketch Club (later, San Francisco Women Artists), founded in 1887, and in 1925, a group of women broke away and formed the San Francisco Society of Women Artists, whose members included Amy D. Flemming. San Francisco Society of Women Artists Sixth Annual Exhibition in the Palace of the Legion of Honor showed Frida Kahlo.

== See also ==
- Women's Athletic Club of Alameda County
- General Federation of Women's Clubs
- Women's club movement in the United States
- Woman's Club of Olympia
- Nineteenth Amendment to the United States Constitution
- Women's Institute
- Women-only space
