= Woman's Club of Rutherford =

- Woman's Club of Rutherford Clubhouse
- U.S. National Register of Historic Places
- New Jersey Register of Historic Places
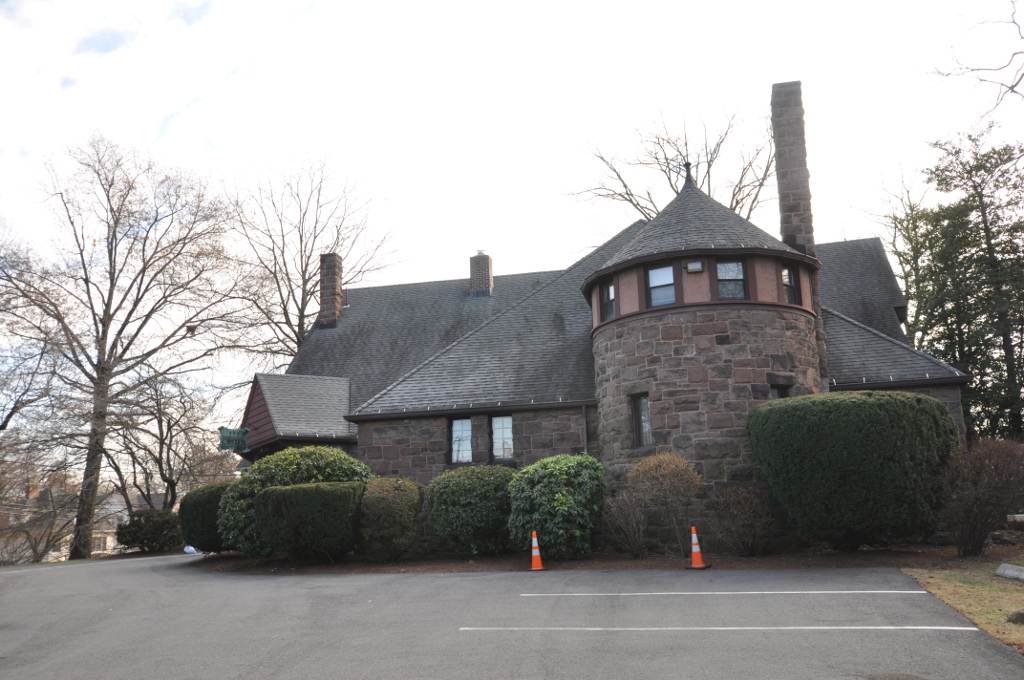
- Clubhouse

- Location within Bergen County, New Jersey Location within New Jersey Location within the United States
- Location: 201 Fairview Avenue, Rutherford, New Jersey
- Coordinates: 40°49′54″N 74°6′42″W
- Built: 1891
- Architect: William Henry Miller
- Architectural style: Tudor Revival, Late Victorian
- NRHP reference No.: 100000852
- NJRHP No.: 5263

Significant dates
- Added to NRHP: April 10, 2017
- Designated NJRHP: February 17, 2017

The Woman's Club of Rutherford is a women's club started in 1889 in the borough of Rutherford in Bergen County, New Jersey, United States. Their clubhouse, also known as Iviswold Stables, is located at 201 Fairview Avenue. It was added to the National Register of Historic Places on April 10, 2017, for its significance in architecture and social history. It met the requirements of the Clubhouses of New Jersey Women's Clubs Multiple Property Submission (MPS).

== See also ==
- List of women's clubs
- National Register of Historic Places listings in Bergen County, New Jersey
