= Kirkland Woman's Club =

Historic women's club in Washington

- U.S. National Register of Historic Places
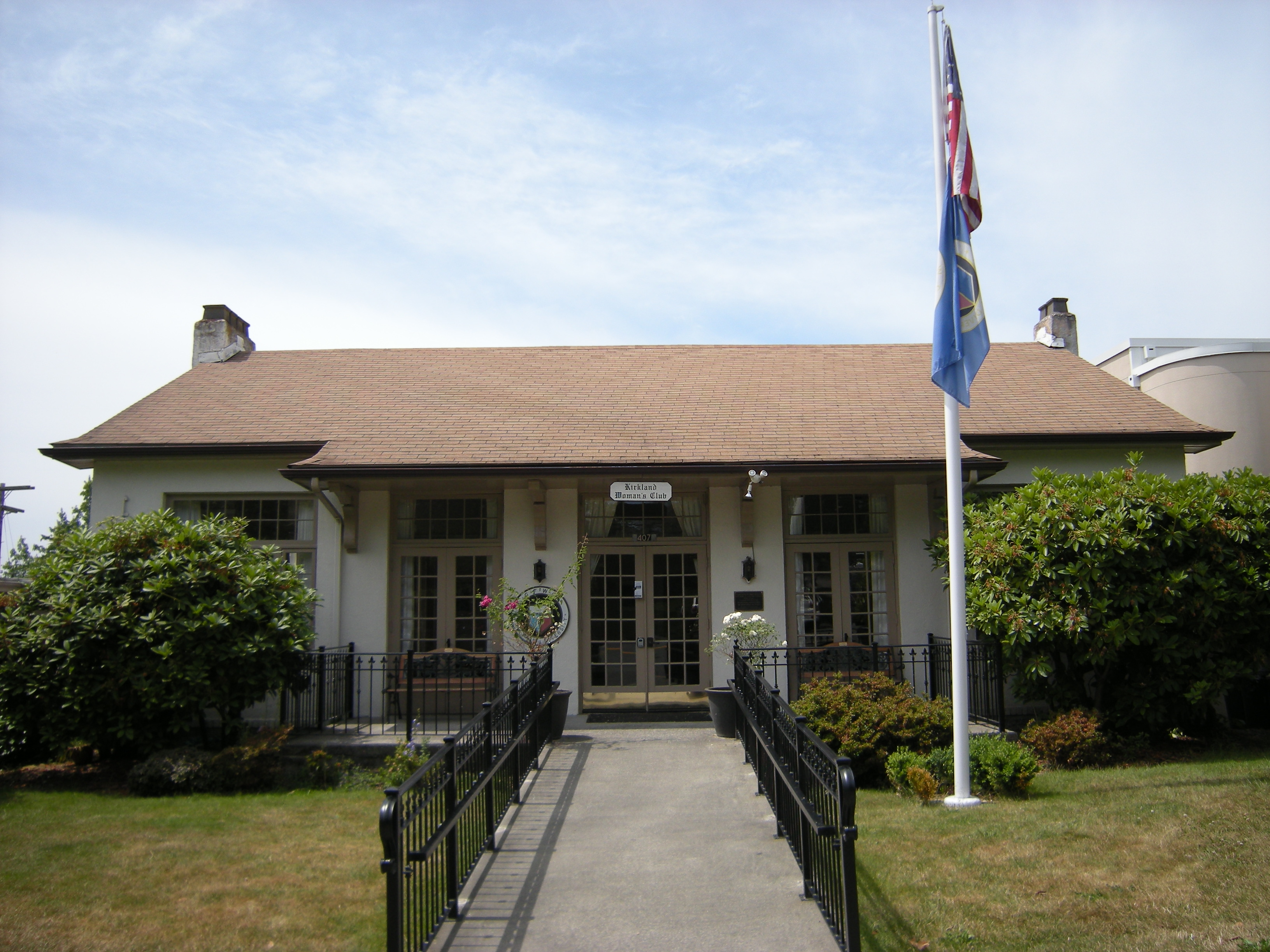
- The front entrance of the clubhouse

- Location within Washington (state) Location within the United States
- Location: 407 First Street, Kirkland, Washington 98033
- Coordinates: 47°40′42″N 122°12′31″W
- Built: 1925
- Architect: John Hanford Wester
- Architectural style: Vernacular
- Website: www.kirklandwomansclub.org
- NRHP reference No.: 89002321
- Added to NRHP: January 26, 1990

The Kirkland Woman's Club is a women's club in Kirkland, Washington. Their clubhouse building was completed in 1925 and listed on the National Register of Historic Places in 1990.

== History ==
The club was founded in 1920 when eight women met and established a charter with the General Federation of Women's Clubs. The building was completed in 1925 through community support: the Burke & Farrar development company gifted the land, local architect and future mayor John Hanford Wester donated the plans, and local high school shop students made the bookshelves.

The building initially served as Kirkland's first public library with donated books and offered free well baby visits with a pediatric clinic. During the Great Depression, the group provided food and clothing to needy families and the building hosted musical events, parent–teacher association meetings, and a Camp Fire club. The club paid off their mortgage in 1937 and the library moved across the street to city hall in 1948. The club continues to provide annual scholarships to local high school students.

In 1999, the group donated a tiered fountain to local cemetery, a civic project that had been proposed in the 1880s but never funded until then. In 2015, the group received support from the Washington Trust for Historic Preservation to secure the pair of chimneys to the roof in order to stabilize them and avoid collapse.

The facilities in the clubhouse are rented out for wedding receptions, funerals, and birthdays. A number of civic organizations without their own building have also met at the location including the Kiwanis and American Legion.

== Architecture ==
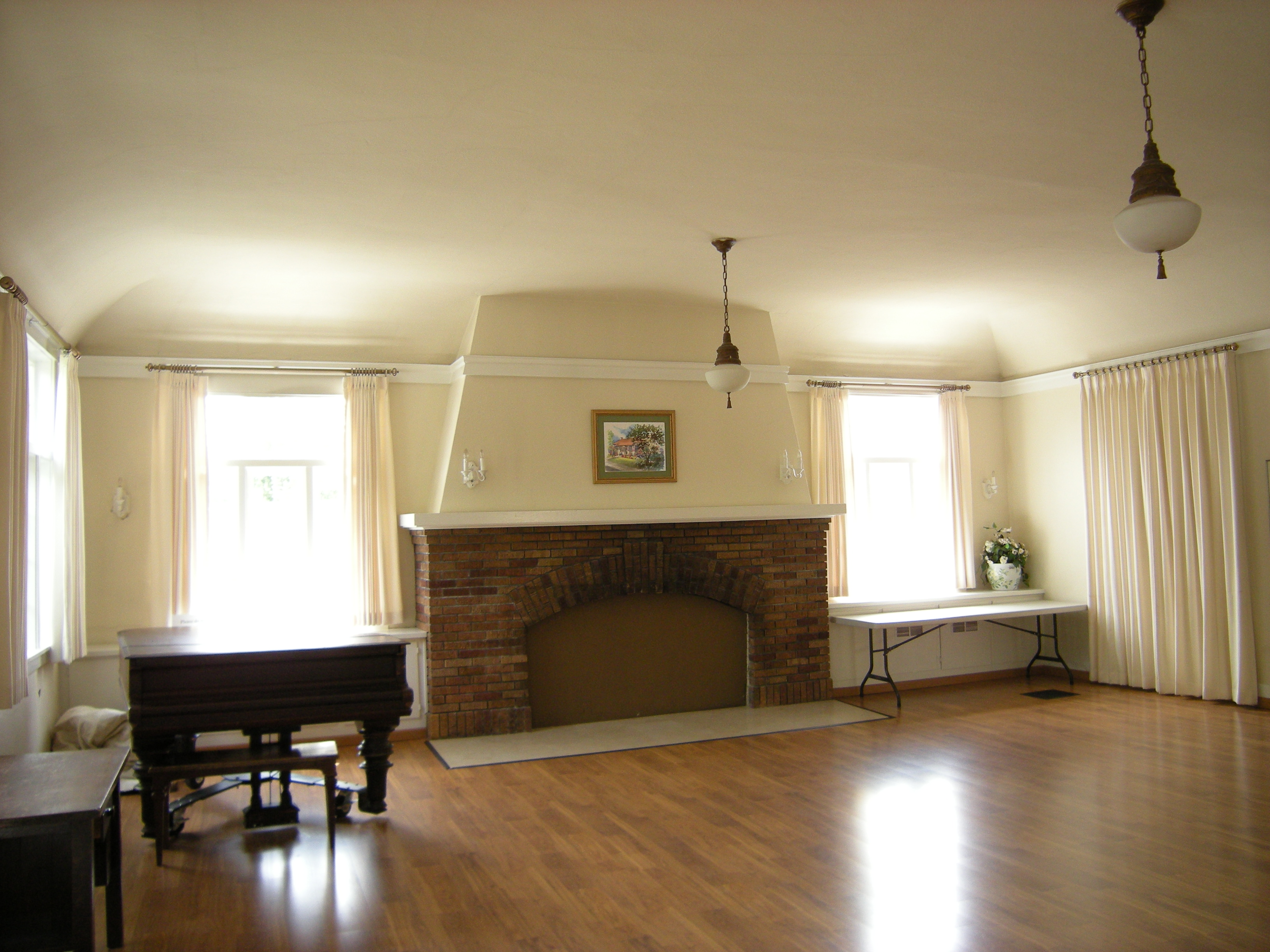
The brick fireplace in the clubroom

The clubhouse is a wood one-story vernacular building with exterior brick chimneys on each end. The front of the building has a central entry bay with three double-leaf French doors and a large ramp that replaced the original two steps. The large windows are composed of multi-light casement units separated by wood mullions. The low-pitched roof has a gable running parallel with the front of the building and overhanging eves with a boxed cornices.

The interior consists of a clubroom to the left of the entrance and a front entry and library room to the right, in what is now a combined room. A kitchen and storage room are located to the rear of the building. There are two fireplaces, a smaller one in the library with a stone voussoir and a larger one in clubroom with a brick voussoir containing a decorative keystone. The rooms have coved ceilings with oak flooring and the original flower-shaped light fixtures.

== See also ==
- List of women's clubs
- National Register of Historic Places listings in King County, Washington
