= La Puente Valley Woman's Club =

- U.S. National Register of Historic Places
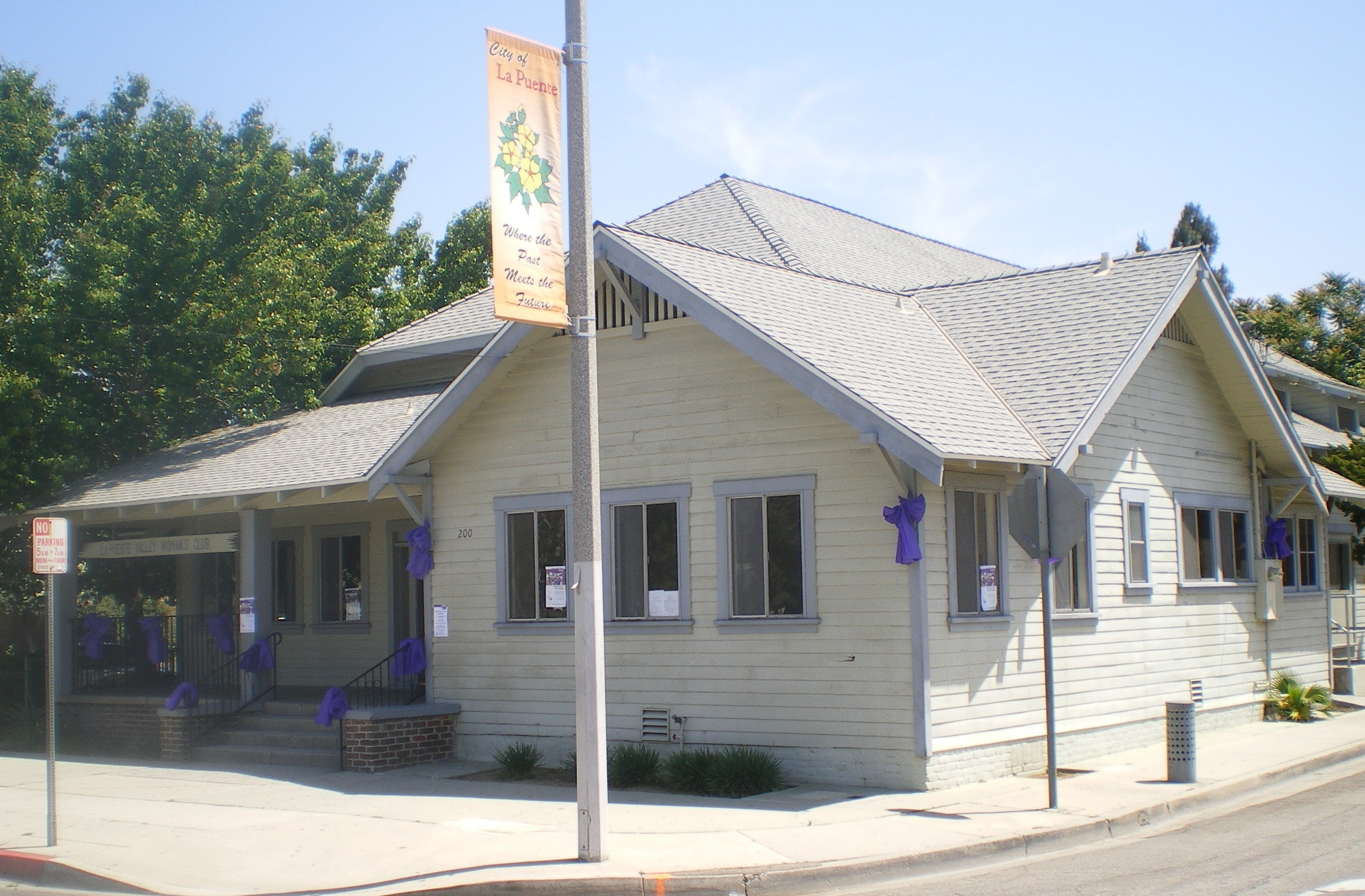
- La Puente Valley Women's Club, 2008

- Location within the Los Angeles metropolitan area Location within California Location within the United States
- Location: La Puente; Los Angeles County, California
- Coordinates: 34°1′19″N 117°57′5″W
- Built: 1923
- Architect: Lee, Charles O.
- Architectural style: Craftsman/Bungalow
- NRHP reference No.: 99000482
- Added to NRHP: April 29, 1999

La Puente Valley Women's Club is a women's club building located in the La Puente Downtown Business District of La Puente, in eastern Los Angeles County, California. It is a member of the General Federation of Women's Clubs.

== Architecture ==
The wooden building was designed by Charles S. Lee in the Craftsman Bungalow style. It was completed in 1923.

The La Puente Valley Woman's Club building was listed in the National Register of Historic Places in 1999.

== See also ==
- Clubhouses in California
- List of women's club buildings
- National Register of Historic Places listings in Los Angeles County, California
