= Woman's Club of Beaumont Clubhouse =

- U.S. National Register of Historic Places
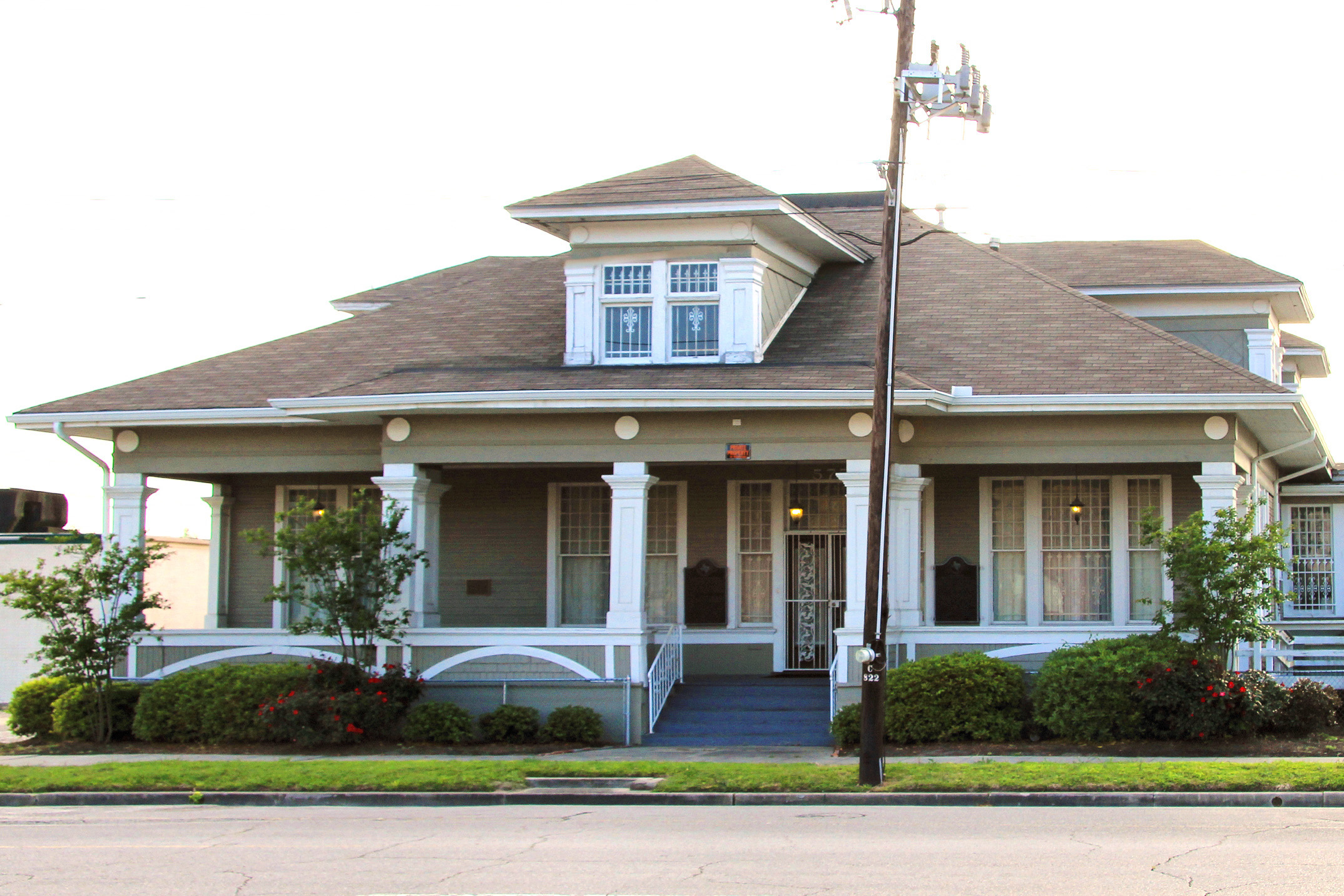

- Location within Texas Location within the United States
- Location: 575 Magnolia Ave., Beaumont, Texas
- Coordinates: 30°05′11″N 94°06′15″W
- Area: less than one acre
- Built: 1909
- Built by: T.W. Thames
- Architect: C.C. McDonald
- Architectural style: Classical Revival
- NRHP reference No.: 94000983
- Added to NRHP: August 16, 1994

The Woman's Club of Beaumont Clubhouse, at 575 Magnolia Ave. in Beaumont, Texas, was built in 1909. It was listed on the National Register of Historic Places in 1994. It has also been known as the Woman's Reading Club.

It was deemed "historically significant for its long association with the development of cultural and social life in the city. Built shortly after the 1901 Spindletop oil discovery, the clubhouse provided a community cultural center with an auditorium and stage for housing educational activities, socials, banquets, dances, plays, musical concerts and art exhibits." The building was used for Red Cross fundraising and otherwise to support the World War I effort, and then again later to support the World War II effort.

It includes Classical Revival influences in its columns and pilasters.
