= Port Arthur Federated Women's Clubhouse =

- U.S. National Register of Historic Places
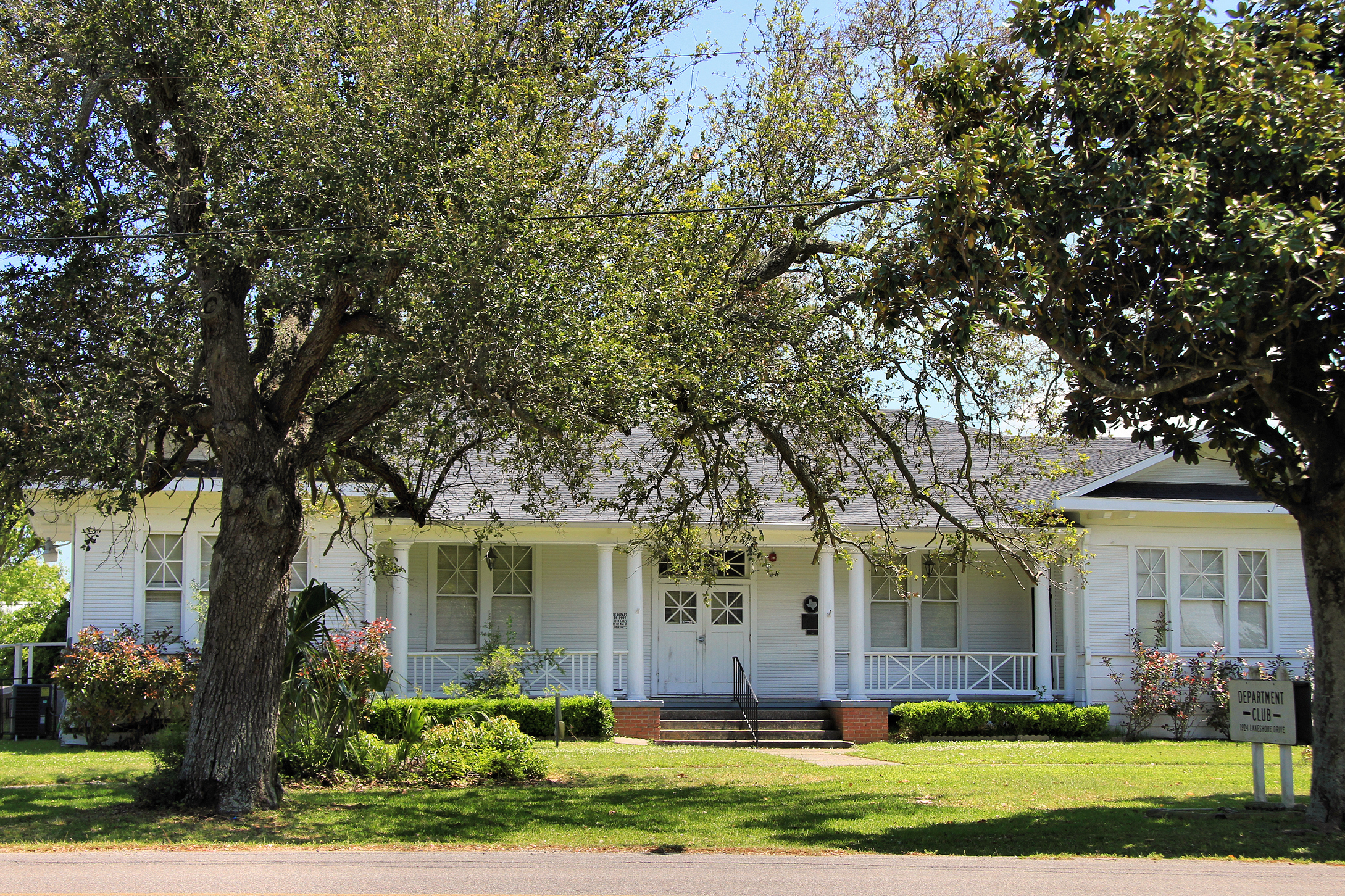

- Location within Texas Location within the United States
- Location: 1924 Lakeshore Dr., Port Arthur, Texas
- Coordinates: 29°52′54″N 93°55′22″W
- Area: less than one acre
- Built: 1924
- Built by: J.H. Baxter
- Architect: Charles L. Wignall
- Architectural style: Bungalow/craftsman
- NRHP reference No.: 85001559
- Added to NRHP: July 18, 1985

The Port Arthur Federated Women's Clubhouse, at 1924 Lakeshore Dr. in Port Arthur, Texas, is a women's club building which was built in 1924. It has also been known as The Department Clubhouse. It was listed on the National Register of Historic Places in 1985.

It is located in Lakeshore Park.

It served as

headquarters for a prestigious and progressive league of women's clubs which date from Port Arthur's founding. Clubwomen have contributed substantially to Port Arthur's social, cultural and political life throughout its history. The building was constructed in 1924 and has been used ever since as headquarters for clubwomen. Designed by Charles L. Wignall, a respected Port Arthur architect, it is one of the most pretentiously designed Bungaloid structures in town. The building's design and location in Lakeshore Park in what was once the most fashionable part of town are conspicuous reminders of the club's prominence in the community.
