= Saturday Club (TV series) =

- Created by: Aaron Haberfield
- Written by: Martin Viski, Jade Suine, Aiden McNicholas; Madelaine Collignon
- Directed by: Martin Viski
- Creative director: Martin Viski
- Presented by: Prime Possum; Madelaine Collignon (Prime TV); Doopa Dog; Madelaine Collignon (GWN)
- Narrated by: Madelaine Collignon, Melanie Ross
- Composers: Josh Peck, Andrew Mooney
- Country of origin: Australia
- Original language: English

Production
- Executive producer: Trevor Clarke
- Producers: Martin Viski, Jade Suine, Aiden McNicholas; Madelaine Collignon
- Cinematography: Glenn Edwards, Simon Cadman
- Camera setup: Sony XDCam
- Running time: approx. 44 minutes (per episode)

Original release
- Network: Prime Television; Golden West Network

Prime7's Saturday Club is a morning children's program, filmed in their Australian Capital Territory studios.

Hosted by Prime Possum and Madelaine Collignon, The program is packaged around popular Disney Cartoons airing at 9am on Saturdays. The program has been packaged around Disney Movies.

GWN7's Saturday Club is hosted by Doopa Dog and Madelaine Collignon.

== History ==
Previous hosts have included Aileen Ward, Remi Broadway, Justin Thomson, Noel Brunning, Shauna Willis, Melanie Ross, Alison Joy & Danneeka Teune.

== Programming ==
Cartoons featured in The Saturday Club have included shows such as:

- Brandy & Mr. Whiskers
- The Replacements
- Kim Possible
- Dave The Barbarian
- Teamo Supremo
- The Buzz on Maggie
- The Proud Family
- American Dragon: Jake Long

== See also ==
- GWN7
- Prime7
