= Women's Athletic Club of Alameda County =

- U.S. National Register of Historic Places
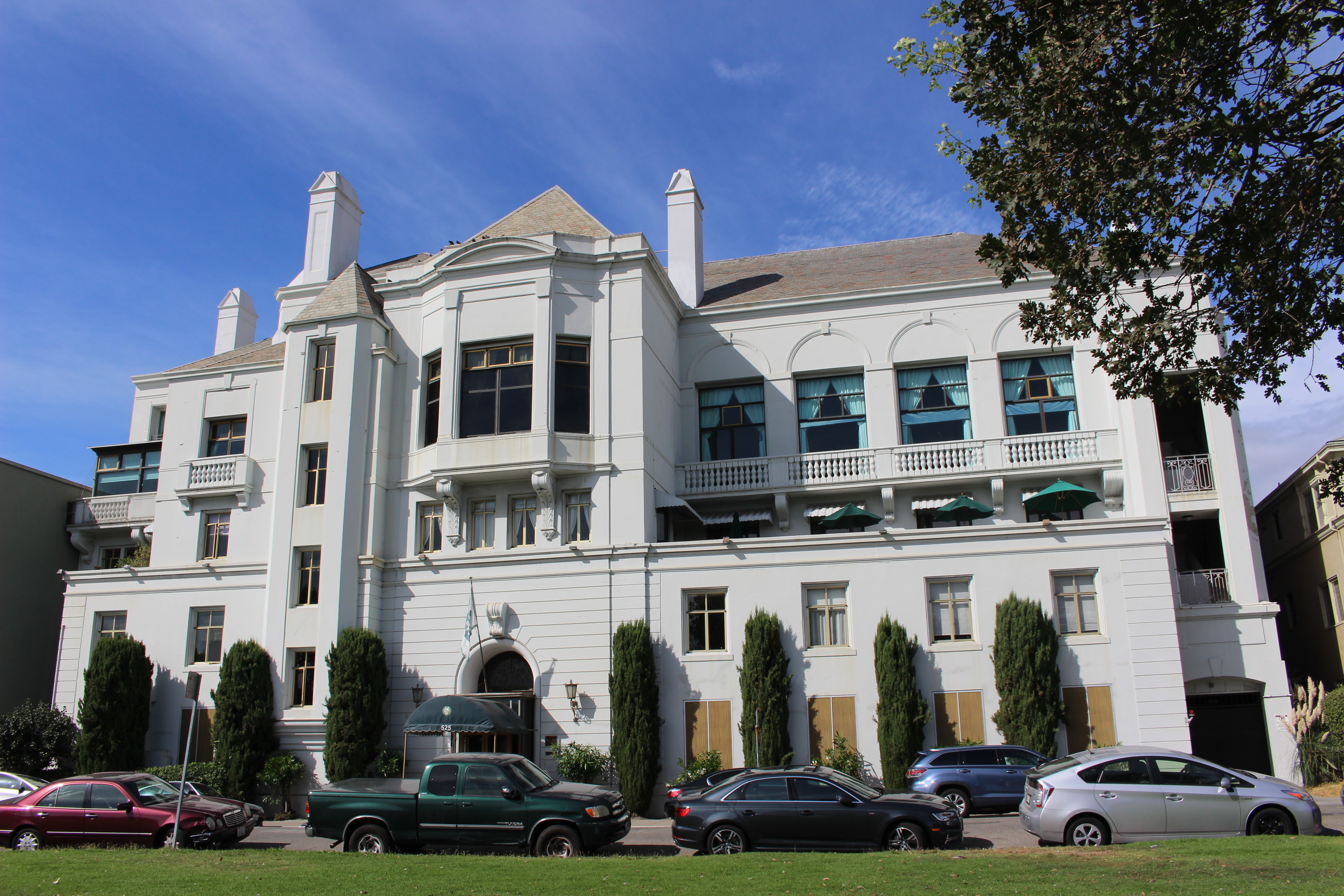

- Location within California
- Location: 525 Bellevue Ave., Oakland, California
- Coordinates: 37°48′28″N 122°15′16″W
- Area: 0.7 acres (0.28 ha)
- Built: 1928-29
- Architects: Roeth, Charles F.B.; Bangs, E. Geoffrey
- Architectural style: Late 19th And 20th Century Revivals, Classical Revival
- NRHP reference No.: 09000247
- Added to NRHP: April 29, 2009

The Women's Athletic Club of Alameda County, at 525 Bellevue Ave. in Oakland, California, was built in 1928–29. It was listed on the National Register of Historic Places in 2009. It has also been known as The Bellevue Club, as Women's Athletic Club, and as Bellevue Club Building.

The Women's Athletic Club of Alameda was formed in 1926 and purchased the site. It hired architects Charles F.B. Roeth and E. Geoffrey Bangs to design their building. Its name was changed to "The Bellevue Club" in the 1990s.

The building is a 47,000 square feet (4,400 m^{2}) clubhouse, with a stucco exterior, plus an internal parking garage. It was built as a five-story (plus partial basement and attic) squarish footprint building, with a one-story section behind. A one-story garage addition at the rear was added in 1964. The interior spaces are Chateauesque or Classical Revival in style.

== See also ==
- Woman's Athletic Club of San Francisco
- List of women's clubs
- National Register of Historic Places listings in Alameda County, California
