= American Legion Post 199 =

US Legion post in Alabama

- U.S. National Register of Historic Places
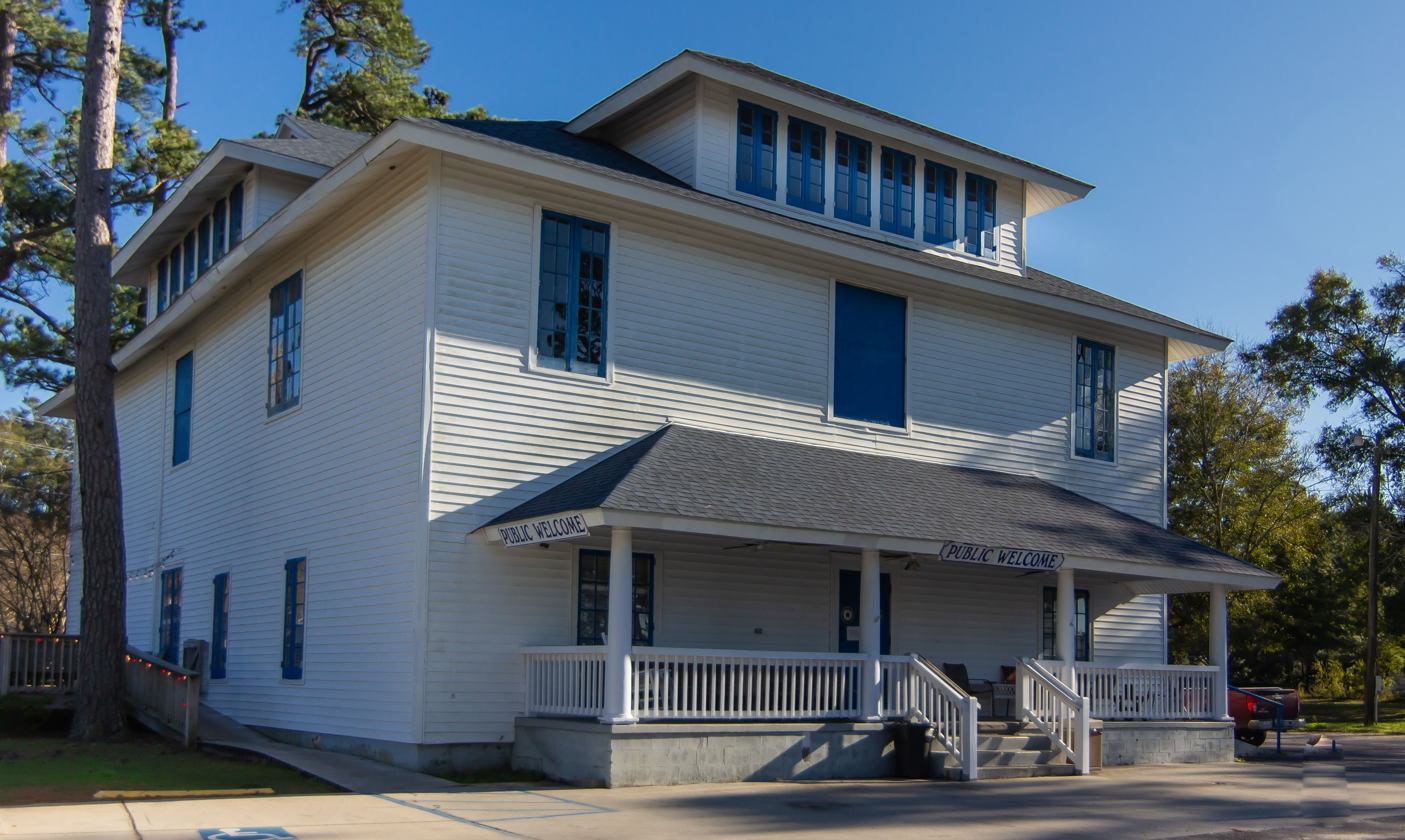

- Location within Alabama
- Location: 700 S Mobile St., Fairhope, Alabama
- Coordinates: 30.51330°N 87.91846°W
- Built: 1912
- NRHP reference No.: 100002858
- Added to NRHP: September 6, 2018

The American Legion Post 199 in Fairhope, Alabama, United States, is situated on a bluff overlooking Mobile Bay. It was listed on the National Register of Historic Places in 2018. It has also been known as Pine Needles and as the Mobile Business Women's Club. It was the Pine Needles Club.

"Past", "Present", and "Future" images at its website show a past appearance, including picturesque porches, is intended to be restored for the future. Its NRHP listing was anticipated.

== History ==
The building was completed in 1912 for the Mobile Business Women's Club, who called it "Pine Needles".

A historic preservation ordinance in Fairhope was reinstituted in 2014. The mayor indicated interest in seeing the American Legion building listed. The mayor asserted "the American Legion is probably one of the oldest buildings in town and he would like to see them figure out how to help the owners preserve it."

In Fairhope, in the early 1900s, women could vote and women professionals were treated as equal counterparts.

The building was hurricane damaged in Hurricane Sally in September 2020; insurance compensation was settled in 2021.
