= Metropolitan Club (San Francisco) =

Historic women's club in San Francisco

- Motto: The House That Women Built

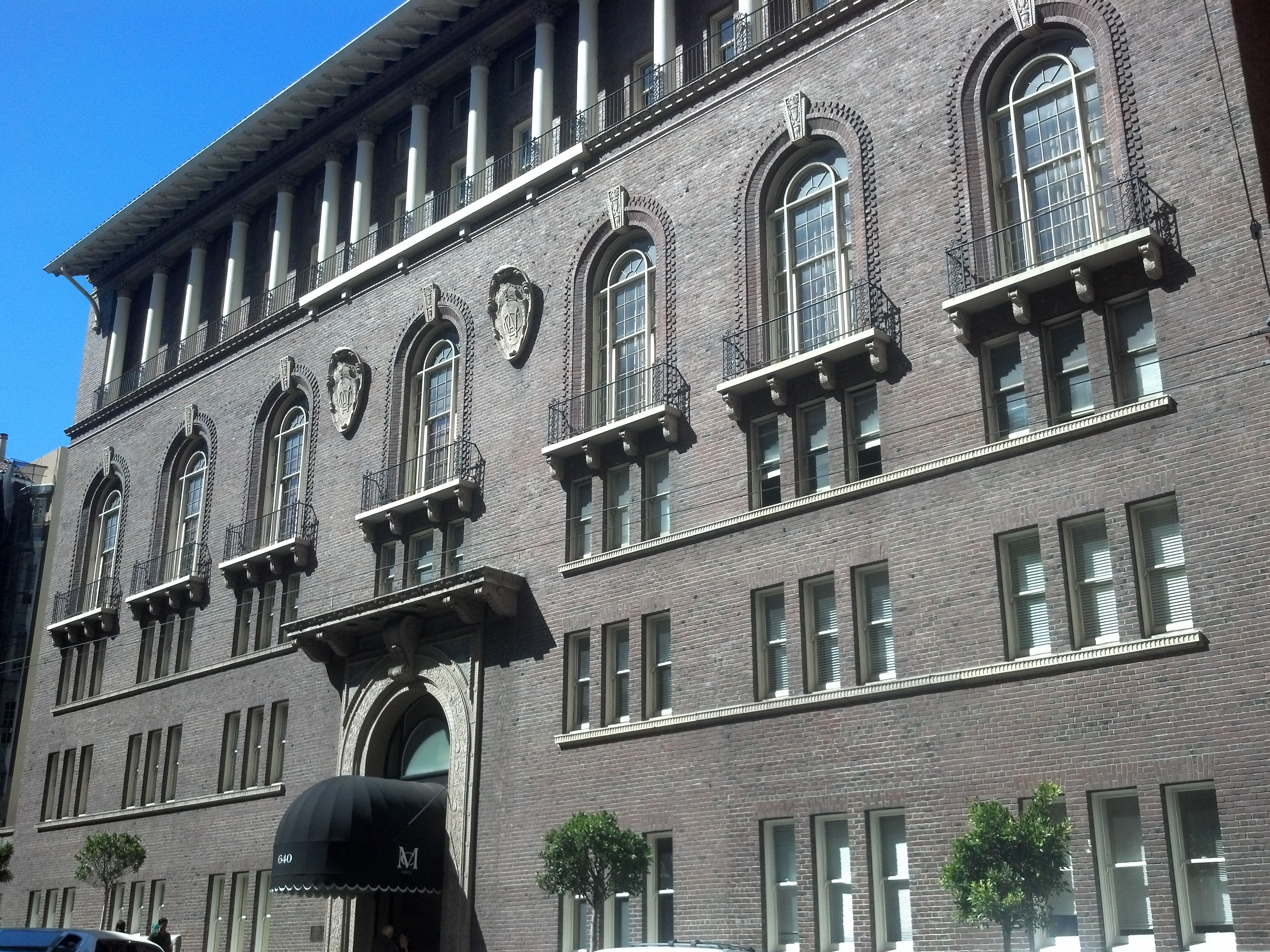
- The facade of the clubhouse

- Location within San Francisco County Location within California Location within the United States
- Nickname: The Met
- Formation: 1915
- Type: Women's club
- Coordinates: 37°47′20″N 122°24′40″W
- Region served: San Francisco Bay Area
- Members: 850 (2023)
- Revenue: US $3.9 million (2023)
- Staff: 48 (2023)
- Website: www.metropolitanclubsf.org
- Formerly called: Woman's Athletic Club of San Francisco
- Woman's Athletic Club of San Francisco
- U.S. National Register of Historic Places
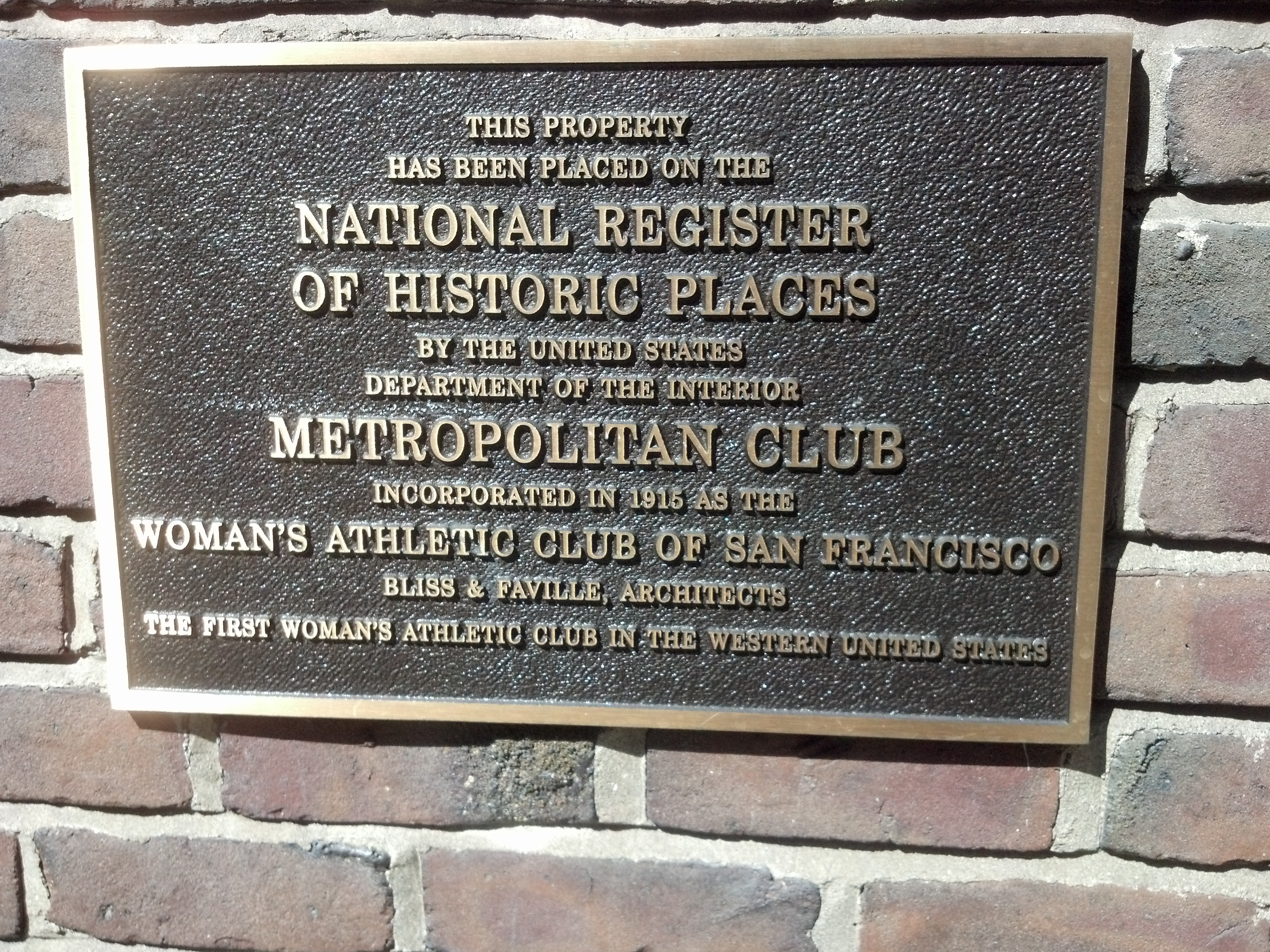
- A brass historical marker
- Area: Union Square
- Built: 1917, 1923
- Built by: C.T. Ryland
- Architects: Walter Danforth Bliss & William Baker Faville
- Architectural style: Italian Renaissance Revival
- NRHP reference No.: 04000955
- Added to NRHP: September 10, 2004

The Metropolitan Club is a women's club in San Francisco, California. Their clubhouse is listed on the National Register of Historic Places as the Woman's Athletic Club of San Francisco.

== History ==
In 1915, a group of local women established the Woman's Athletic Club of San Francisco to promote physical fitness and camaraderie among women and modeled it after the Woman's Athletic Club of Chicago. It was the first women's athletic club west of the Mississippi.

The clubhouse was built in phases in 1917 and 1923. The site was selected in the Union Square neighborhood three blocks south of the Pacific-Union gentlemen's club.

In 1938, the club opened the Kakemono Lounge, a cocktail lounge decorated with Japanese influences. In 1941 during World War II, the club extended dining privileges to women working in the Red Cross Motor Corps. In 1945, the club hosted wives of delegates during the establishment of the United Nations. In 1953, the club converted the lounge into a library.

In 1966, the membership voted to change their name to the "Metropolitan Club" to reflect their broader mission beyond just athletics. In the 1980s, the club discussed but ultimately declined merging with the nearby Olympic Club, a then all-male athletic organization.

In 2004, while other women's club had declining membership in San Francisco, the Metropolitan was the largest partly through offering members incentives to recruit. The club is a popular rental venue for wedding receptions and other events.

== Architecture ==
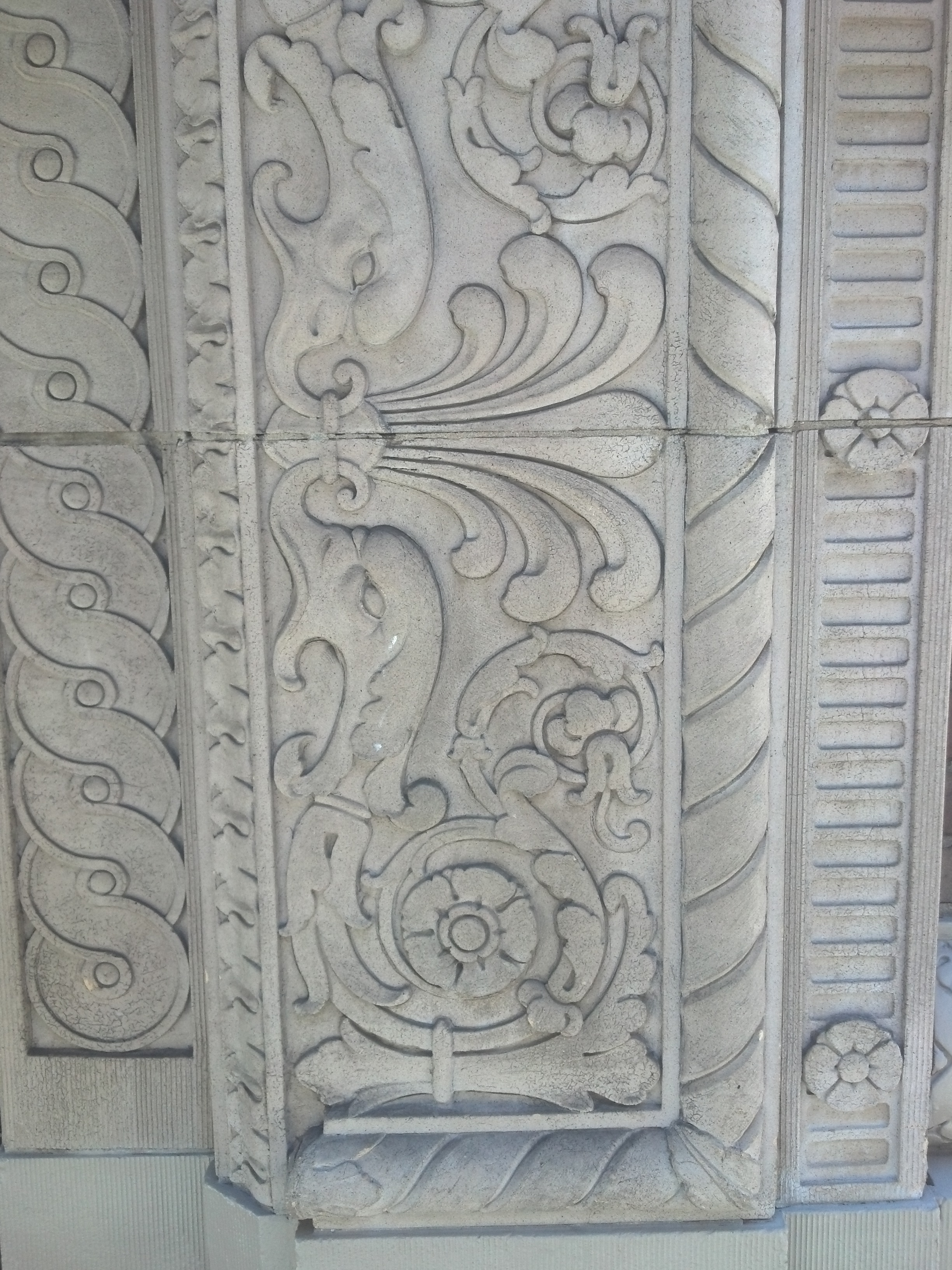
Detail of the arched entryway

The architectural partnership of Walter Danforth Bliss and William Baker Faville designed the clubhouse in an Italian Renaissance Revival style influenced by palazzos of Florence. The six-story building has a U-layout and is between a surface parking lot owned by the club and a former YWCA building owned by the Academy of Art University.

The front of the building uses materials of contrasting colors consisting of common bond red brick walls, cream-colored terra cotta details, black iron railings, and a red tile roof. The arched entry way has a rectangular frame with marble spandrels and spans the first and second stories. The third story has corbelled balconies in front of each window. The fourth floor has a pair of terra cotta escutcheons with the original WAC logo. The fifth and sixth floors have a two-story colonnade in front of a loggia. The other three sides of the building are relatively plain.

The interior includes a formal lobby with an ionic order of paired columns and pilasters supporting beams treated as an entablature. The swimming pool is dug into the basement based on structural considerations. The public dining room is on the fourth floor with a private dining room, known as the Tapestry Room. The building also contains a gym, locker rooms, spa, salon, offices, kitchens, conference rooms, and hotel rooms available to guests of members.

== See also ==
- Francisca Club
- List of women's clubs
- National Register of Historic Places listings in San Francisco
