= Woman's Club of Redondo Beach =

- U.S. National Register of Historic Places
- Location within the Los Angeles metropolitan area Location within California Location within the United States
- Location: 400 S. Broadway, Redondo Beach, California
- Coordinates: 33°50′12″N 118°23′6″W
- Area: 0.1 acres (0.040 ha)
- Built: 1922
- Architectural style: Bungalow/craftsman
- NRHP reference No.: 84000900
- Added to NRHP: April 19, 1984

The Woman's Club of Redondo Beach is part of the California Federation of Women's Clubs (CFWC) and was founded in 1908. Included in the Mission Statement of the Woman's Club of Redondo Beach is the care and preservation of their Clubhouse which was built in 1922 and is listed on the National Register of Historic Places.

== Building ==
The building's design "reflects the beach community character of Redondo Beach during its early years. Using redwood board and batten construction, the building expresses the vernacular bungalow tradition once popular in Southern California's coastal areas." The building is one of the largest surviving in the South Beach communities, of buildings of its type.

== Club history ==
On November 6, 1908, a small group of twenty women, ambitious to be helpful in the civic and cultural life of their community, organized the Woman's Club of Redondo Beach. An agenda was adopted to support local charities, provide social services through volunteerism, promote cultural and civic advancement as well as hosting social events.

The club was accepted into the General Federation of Women's Clubs in 1910 and incorporated November 7, 1915 under the state laws of California.

On May 6, 1922, construction of the Clubhouse was begun at 400 South Broadway, Redondo Beach. In October 1922, the first meeting was held in the new building.

A Junior Membership was established in 1922; the Dianas, an intermediary group was organized in 1932, for women under the age of 35, after which time they would join the Woman's Club. The Evening Division (to accommodate members who were unable to attend during the day) was formed in 1949, but later disbanded.
