= Country Woman's Club (Clarksville, Tennessee) =

- U.S. National Register of Historic Places
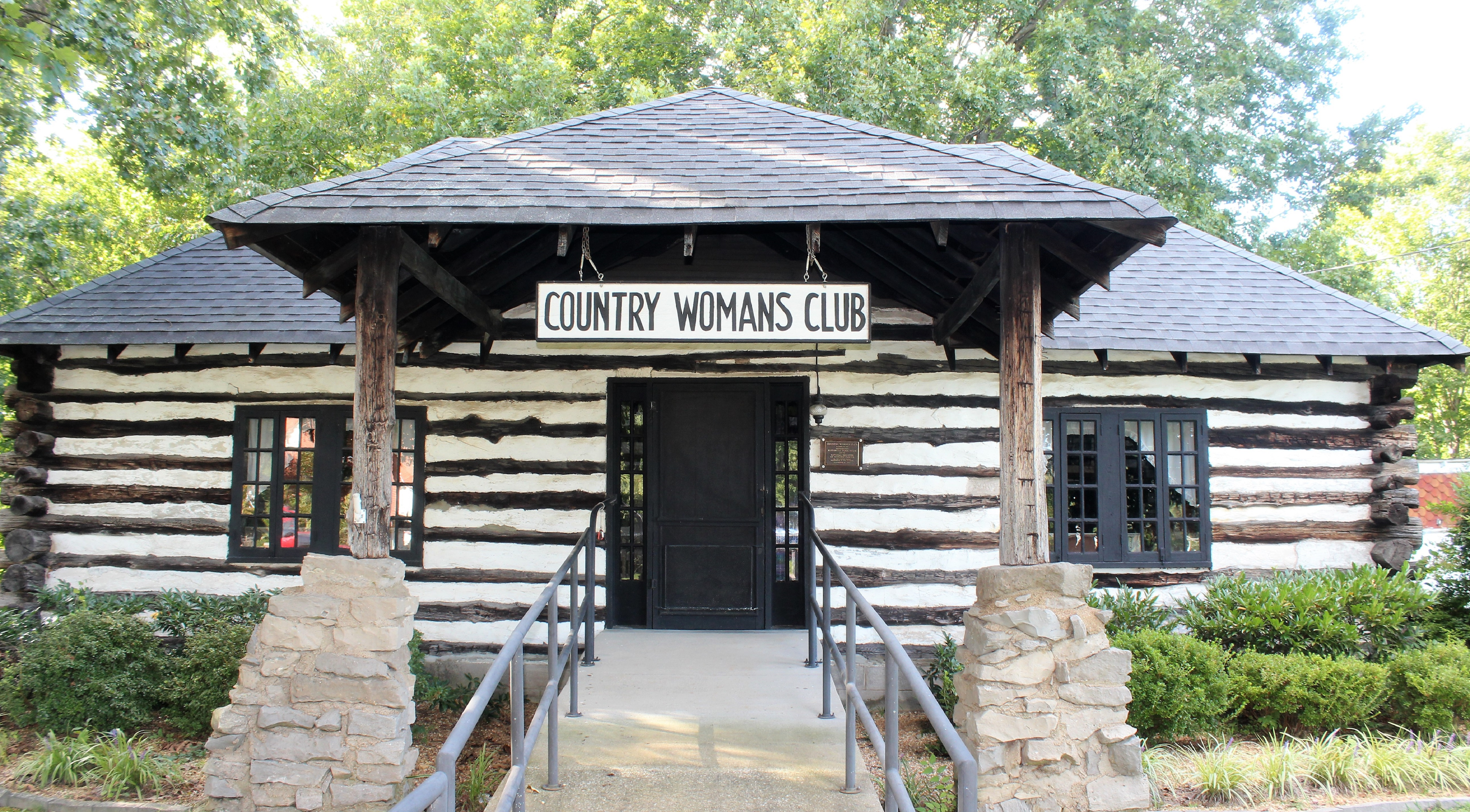

- Location within Tennessee
- Location: 2216 Old Russellville Pike, Clarksville, Tennessee
- Coordinates: 36°34′00″N 87°18′07″W
- Area: less than one acre
- Built: 1927
- Architectural style: Bungalow/craftsman, Log Cabin
- NRHP reference No.: 06000549
- Added to NRHP: July 5, 2006

The Country Woman's Club was founded in the unincorporated community of St. Bethlehem, Tennessee in 1922, as a monthly meeting at one of the member's houses. It expanded to 35 members who eventually moved to meet at the White's Creek Chapel School.

Its club building, built in 1927, is a Craftsman Style log building with a hipped roof, which was built by husbands of the club members. The building was listed on the National Register of Historic Places in 2006. It was deemed

important in the woman's club movement, as a visible reflection of the consciousness of gender-specific activities and community roles. It also represents the relative educational, intellectual, political, and civic interests of rural Montgomery County women during the twentieth century. Architecturally the building is a fine example of a twentieth-century log building with Craftsman influence. The Country Woman's Club retains a high degree of architectural and historical integrity.

The building is now within the city limits of Clarksville, Tennessee, which expanded.
