= C. H. Burroughs House =

Historic house in Ohio, United States

- C.H. Burroughs House
- U.S. National Register of Historic Places
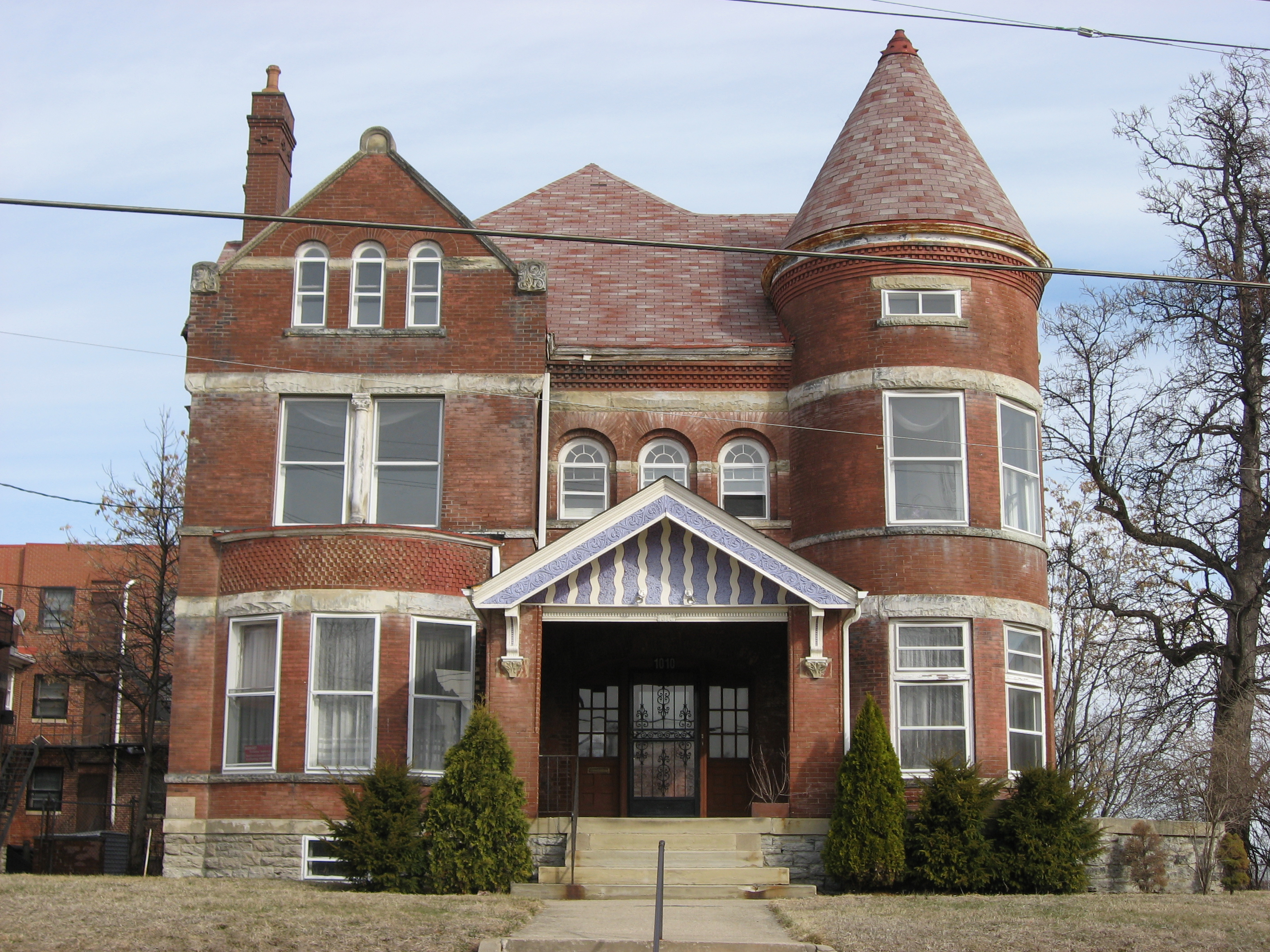
- Front of the house

- Location within Ohio Location within the United States
- Location: 1010 Chapel St., Cincinnati, Ohio
- Coordinates: 39°7′52″N 84°29′15″W
- Area: Less than 1 acre (0.40 ha)
- Built: 1888
- Architect: Samuel Hannaford and Sons
- Architectural style: Queen Anne, Romanesque Revival
- MPS: Samuel Hannaford and Sons TR in Hamilton County
- NRHP reference No.: 80003039
- Added to NRHP: March 3, 1980

The C.H. Burroughs House is a historic former house in Cincinnati, Ohio, United States. Constructed at the end of the nineteenth century by one of the city's most prominent architects, the house has been converted into a social club, but it retains enough of its integrity to qualify for designation as a historic site.

== History ==
C.H. Burroughs arranged for the construction of the present house in 1888, using land that had formerly been owned by the nearby Lane Theological Seminary. Its design was produced by Samuel Hannaford, a prominent Cincinnati architect. The Burroughs House is one of many surviving Hannaford houses that were built in some of Cincinnati's most prestigious neighborhoods, including Walnut Hills, Clifton, and Avondale. Many of Hannaford's designs were constructed in such neighborhoods because of the architect's reputation: he was known for insisting on the highest quality materials and workmanship and for his willingness to design structures in many popular architectural styles. As a result, his designs gained great favor among many of the great men of politics and business in Gilded Age Cincinnati. Located in Walnut Hills, the house is owned by the Cincinnati Federation of Colored Women's Clubs, a group of social clubs for black women. The organization purchased the property in 1925 in order to have space in which they could meet without fear of race-based exclusion; they took more than twenty years to pay the mortgage in full, but the house quickly became a subject of pride for the members. Members use the house to host community functions, including charitable events to mentor children and to bring elderly adults together with older children.

== Architecture ==
Built of brick, the C.H. Burroughs House rests on a stone foundation and is covered by a slate roof. Two and a half stories tall, its design mixes elements of the Queen Anne and Romanesque Revival architectural styles. The house's general floor plan is irregular, lacking symmetry, due partly to the presence of a prominent gable on one side of the facade and a round turret on another side. Including these two segments, the facade is divided into three bays, with a portico at the base of the middle bay, surrounding the main entrance. Even the front gable displays irregularity by the presence of a bay window solely in the first story. On all sides of the exterior, lintels of ashlar form belt courses, while lugsills combine to produce string courses. Most of the house is covered by a hip roof, although the turret's roof rises to a conical peak. The interior is divided into seventeen rooms, decorated with elements such as carven wood, brass chandeliers, multiple fireplaces with ornamental mantels, and crown molding.

== Preservation ==
In early 1980, the Burroughs House was listed on the National Register of Historic Places, qualifying because of its distinctive historic architecture. Dozens of other properties in Cincinnati were added to the Register at the same time as part of a multiple property submission of buildings designed by Samuel Hannaford. The house was renovated in 1998 after the Cincinnati city government gave the club $230,000 for structural improvements.
