= Topeka Council of Colored Women's Clubs Building =

- U.S. National Register of Historic Places
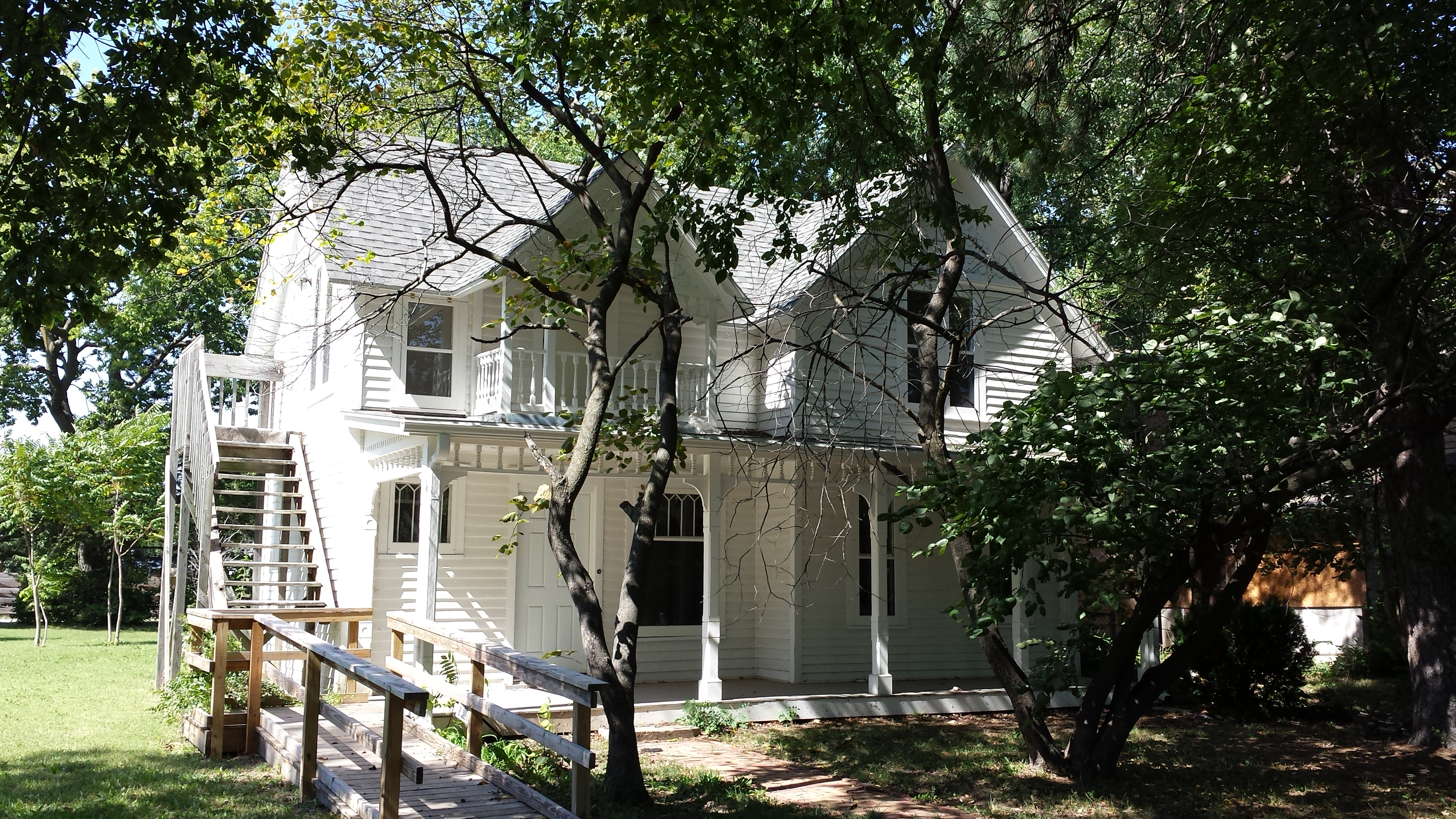
- The Topeka Council of Colored Women's Clubs Building in 2013

- Location within Kansas
- Location: 1149 SW Lincoln
- Coordinates: 39.0479°N 95.6942°W
- Built: 1901
- NRHP reference No.: 09001169
- Added to NRHP: December 30, 2009

The Topeka Council of Colored Women's Clubs Building was the clubhouse of the Topeka Council of Colored Women's Clubs (TCCWC). It was listed on the National Register of Historic Places in the United States in 2009. It is located in Topeka, Kansas.

== History ==
The Topeka Council of Colored Women's Clubs (TCCWC) was founded by Beatrice Childs in 1923. TCCWC was affiliated with the National Association of Colored Women's Clubs (NACWC) and with the Kansas Association of Colored Women's Clubs (KACWC). TCCWC itself was made up of seven different smaller clubs. TCCWC members met in their own homes or in churches until they were able to purchase a clubhouse in 1931. The money to purchase the clubhouse was loaned by Emma Gaines to TCCWC.

The building that later became the clubhouse for TCCWC was built as a family home by William Warren in 1901. It is located in Tennessee Town in Topeka, Kansas at 1149 SW Lincoln Street. On December 30, 2009, it was listed in the National Register of Historic Places. Plans to refurbish the house have been undertaken by the organization, Living the Dream Inc.
