= Saturday Club (Wayne, Pennsylvania) =

- U.S. National Register of Historic Places
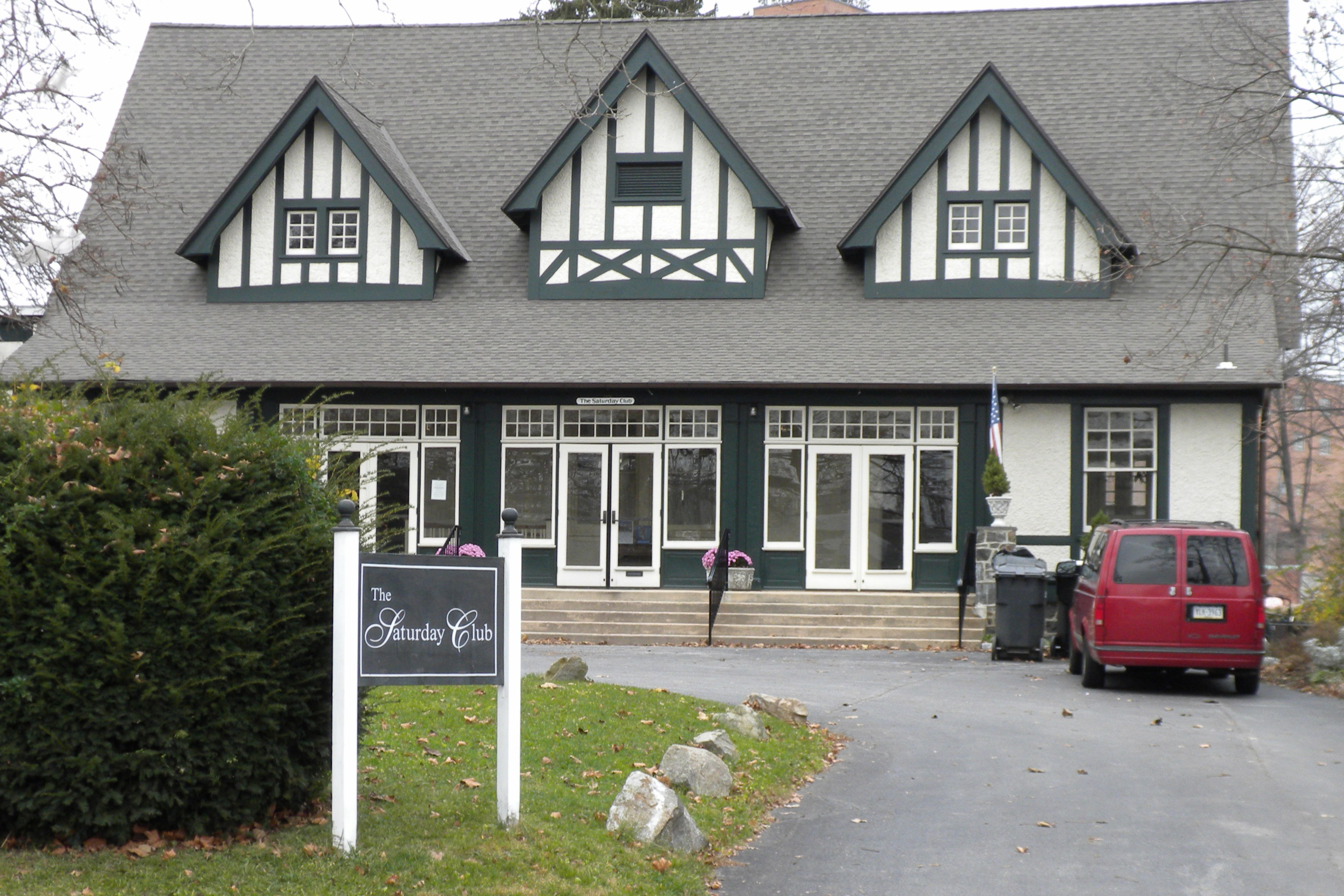
- Saturday Club, November 2009

- Location within Pennsylvania Location within the United States
- Location: 117 W. Wayne Ave., Wayne, Pennsylvania
- Coordinates: 40°2′36″N 75°23′21″W
- Area: 0.2 acres (0.081 ha)
- Built: 1899
- Architectural style: English Half Timber
- NRHP reference No.: 78002395
- Added to NRHP: March 14, 1978

The Saturday Club is an historic women's club clubhouse in Wayne, Delaware County, Pennsylvania, United States.

It was added to the National Register of Historic Places in 1978.

== History and architectural features ==
Built in 1898, this historic structure is a one-and-one-half-story, English Half Timber frame building that measures approximately fifty-five feet by seventy-five feet, and has a gable roof with three gabled dormers. Its appearance is patterned after Shakespeare's Birthplace in Stratford-on-Avon, England.
