= Woman's Club of Tallahassee =

- U.S. National Register of Historic Places
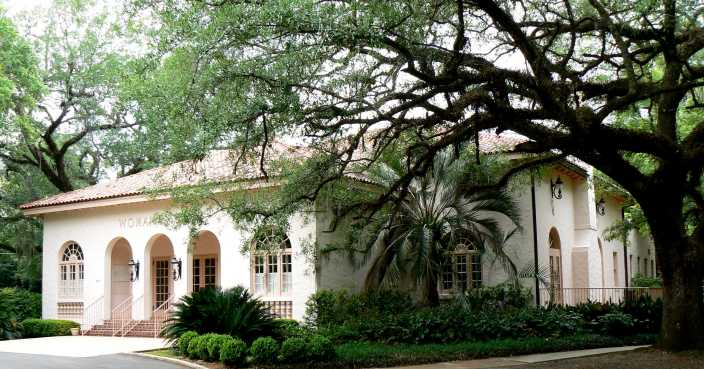
- Woman's Club of Tallahassee, in 2007

- Location within Florida Location within the United States
- Location: Tallahassee, Florida
- Coordinates: 30°27′38″N 84°16′32″W
- Built: 1927
- Architectural style: Mediterranean Revival
- NRHP reference No.: 87002046
- Added to NRHP: November 18, 1987

The Woman's Club of Tallahassee is a historic woman's club in Tallahassee, Florida. It is located at 1513 Cristobal Drive. On November 18, 1987, it was added to the U.S. National Register of Historic Places.

== See also ==
List of Registered Historic Woman's Clubhouses in Florida
