= Bee Ridge Woman's Club =

- U.S. National Register of Historic Places
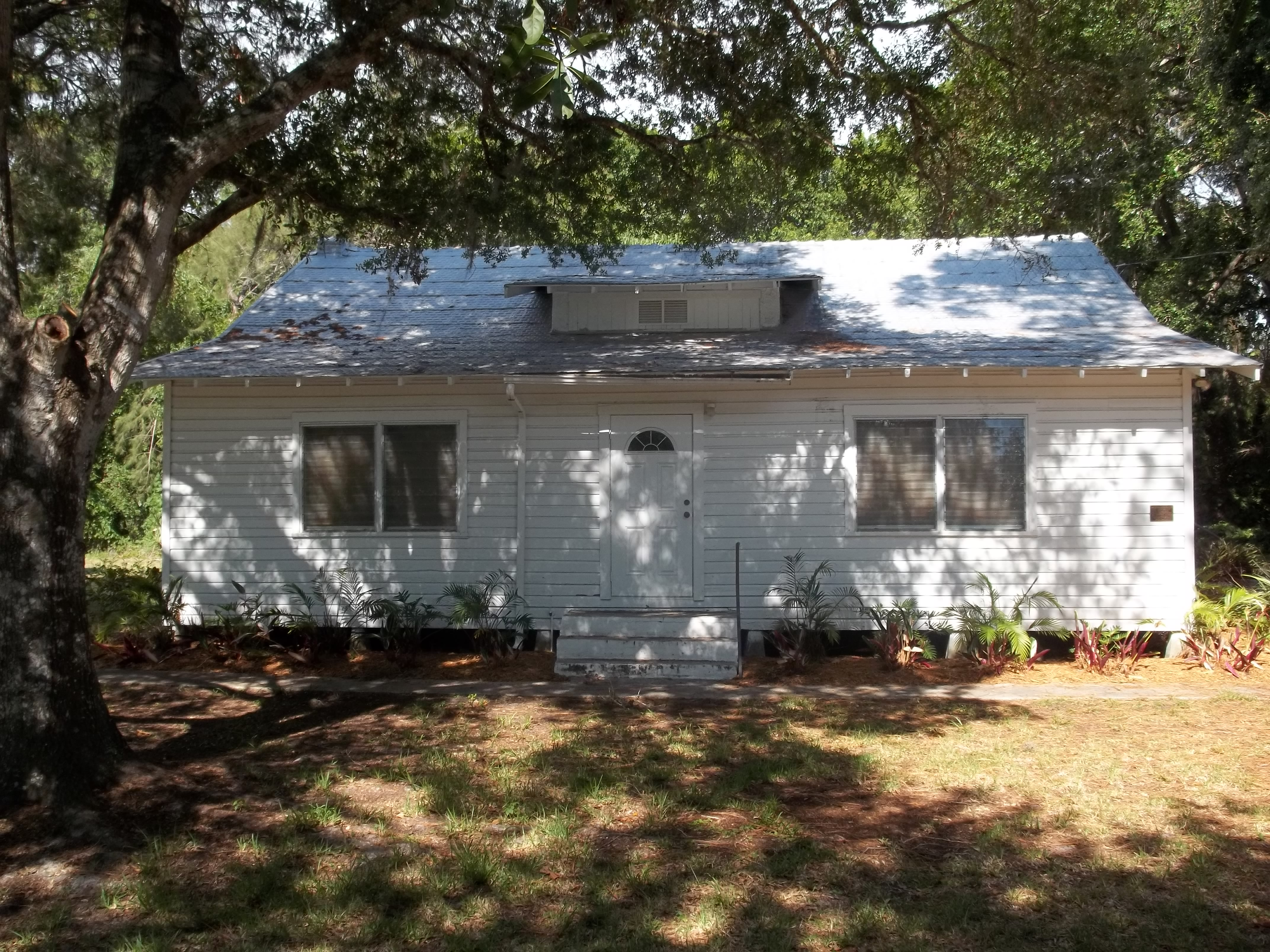

- Location within Florida Location within the United States
- Location: Sarasota, Florida
- Coordinates: 27°16′53″N 82°29′3″W
- NRHP reference No.: 95000052
- Added to NRHP: February 10, 1995

The Bee Ridge Woman's Club is a historic woman's club in Sarasota, Florida, United States. The club was founded in 1915 as the Get-Together-Club and took its name as Bee Ridge Woman's club in 1917. In 1922 construction began on a clubhouse and the building was completed in 1923. It is located at 4919 Andrew Avenue. On February 10, 1995, it was added to the U.S. National Register of Historic Places.

== See also ==
- List of Registered Historic Woman's Clubhouses in Florida
