= Lloyd Woman's Club =

- U.S. National Register of Historic Places
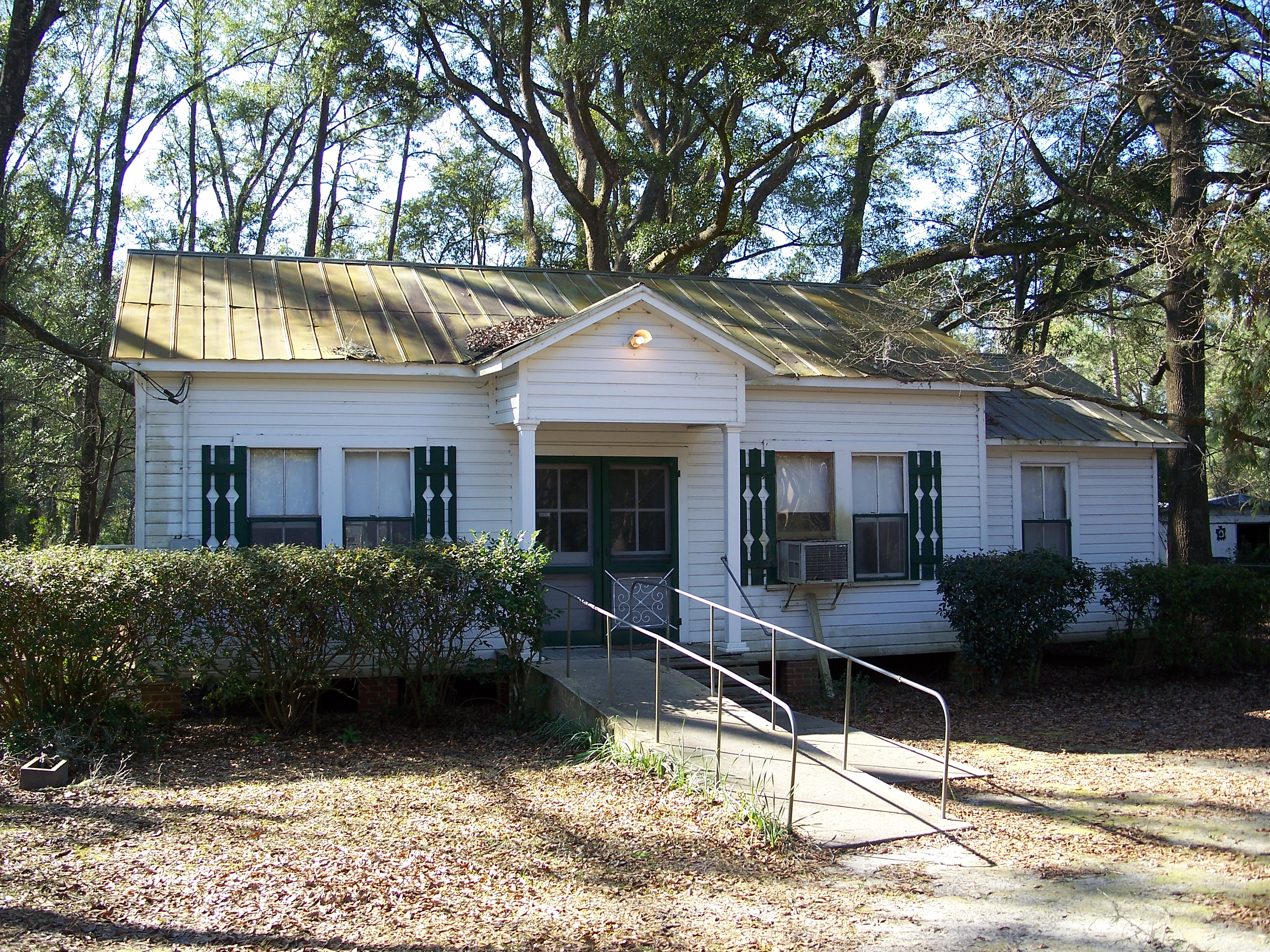
- Location: Lloyd, Florida
- Coordinates: 30°28′39″N 84°1′38″W
- Built: 1939
- Architectural style: Frame Vernacular
- MPS: Clubhouses of Florida's Woman's Clubs MPS
- NRHP reference No.: 98000926
- Added to NRHP: August 10, 1998

The Lloyd Woman's Club (also known as the Lloyd Home Demonstration Club) is a historic woman's club in Lloyd, Florida, and a Home Demonstration Club location. It is located on Bond Street. On August 10, 1998, it was added to the U.S. National Register of Historic Places.

As of 2024, the Lloyd Woman's Club continues to serve as an important community center and historic site in Jefferson County, Florida. The building's listing on the National Register recognizes its architectural significance and role in the history of women's civic engagement in the state.

== See also ==
List of Registered Historic Woman's Clubhouses in Florida
