= Bradenton Woman's Club =

Historic women's club in Florida

- U.S. National Register of Historic Places
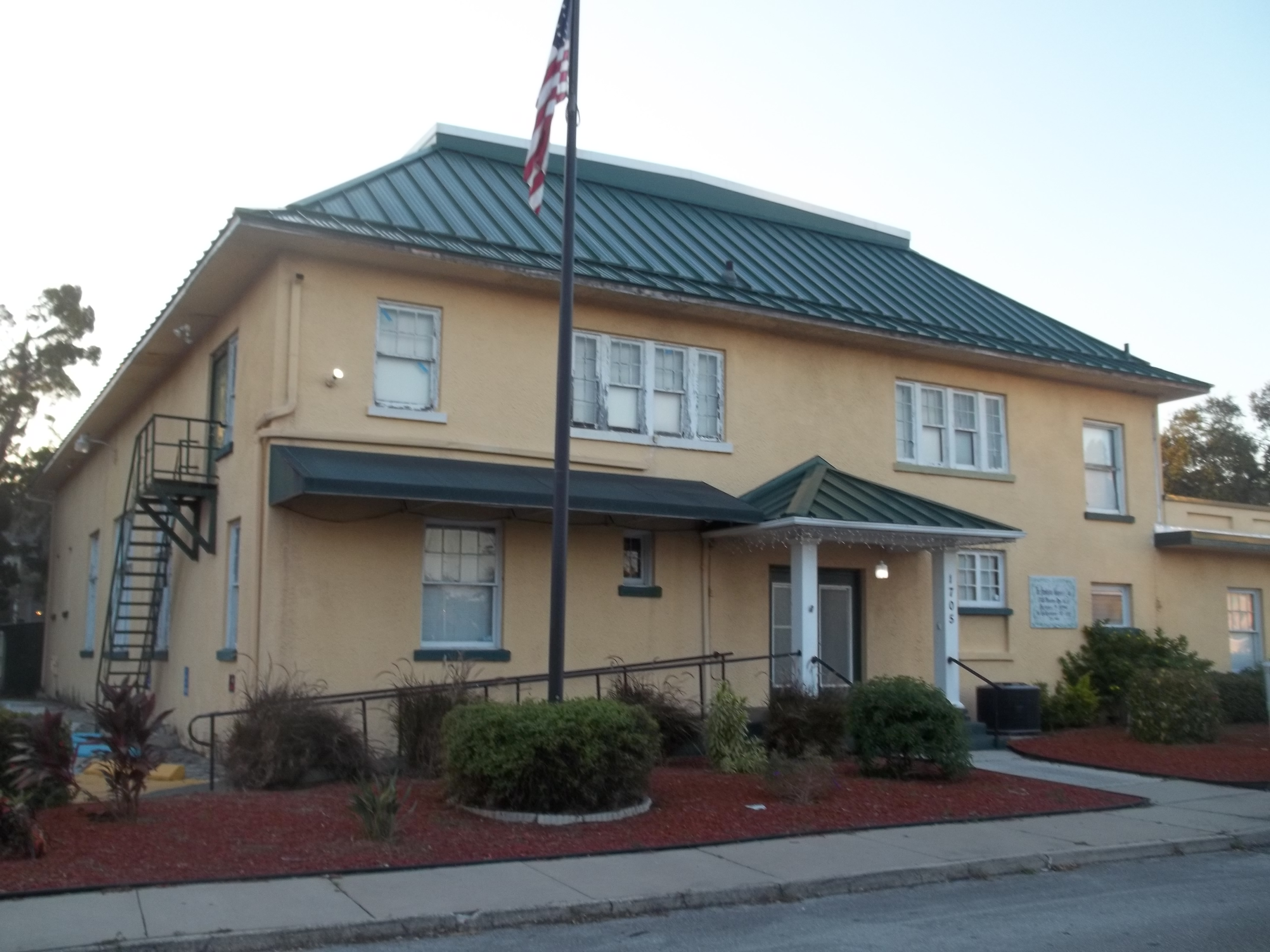
- The clubhouse in 2018

- Location within Florida Location within the United States
- Location: 1705 Manatee Avenue West, Bradenton, Florida 34205
- Coordinates: 27°29′43″N 82°34′43″W
- Built: 1921
- Architect: Fred W. Kemode
- Architectural style: Colonial Revival
- Website: www.bradentonwomansclub.com
- MPS: Clubhouses of Florida's Woman's Clubs Multiple Property Submission
- NRHP reference No.: 100003409
- Added to NRHP: February 4, 2019

The Bradenton Woman's Club is a women's club in Bradenton, Florida. Their clubhouse building was completed in 1921 and was listed on the National Register of Historic Places in 2019 as part of a Multiple Property Submission.

== History ==
The group was founded in 1913 by 16 women, eight years before they completed the building. The organization continuously raises money for local charities with weekly dances, private rentals, and charity galas. Starting in 2004, the group started a multi-year campaign to restore the building to its original condition.

They began celebrating their centennial in 2012. In 2017, Hurricane Irma stripped off most of the building roof, which flooded the original dance floor, warping the wood but the group was able to re-open later in the year with donations from the community.

== Architecture ==
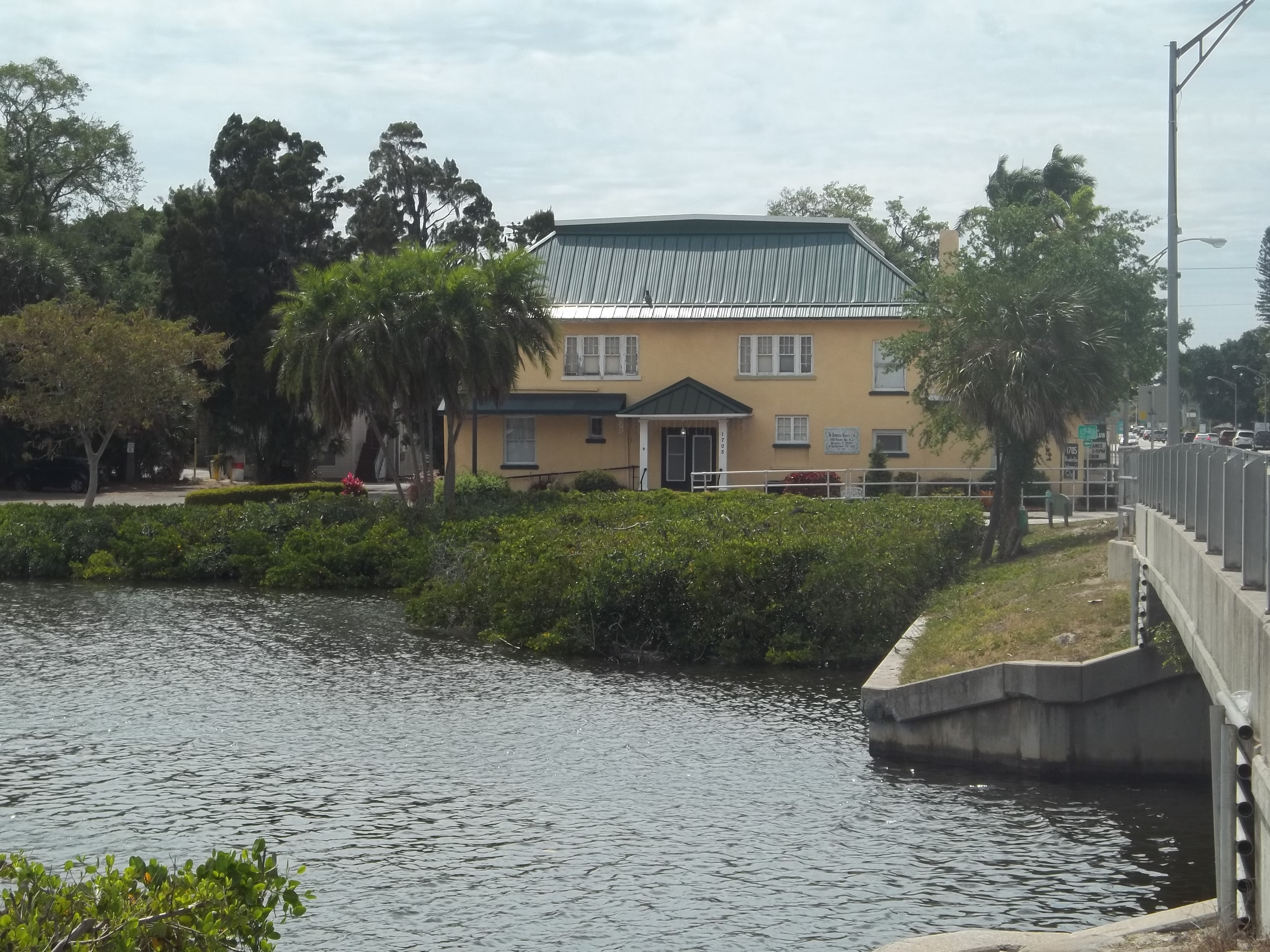
The clubhouse with Wares Creek in the foreground

The 11,388-square-foot building was completed in 1921 during the Florida Land Boom and cost $22,500 to build. The Colonial Revival building was designed by architect Fred W. Kermode and includes a mezzanine with an open two-story meeting space.

== See also ==
- National Register of Historic Places listings in Manatee County, Florida
- List of Woman's Clubhouses in Florida on the National Register of Historic Places
