= Melrose Woman's Club =

- U.S. National Register of Historic Places
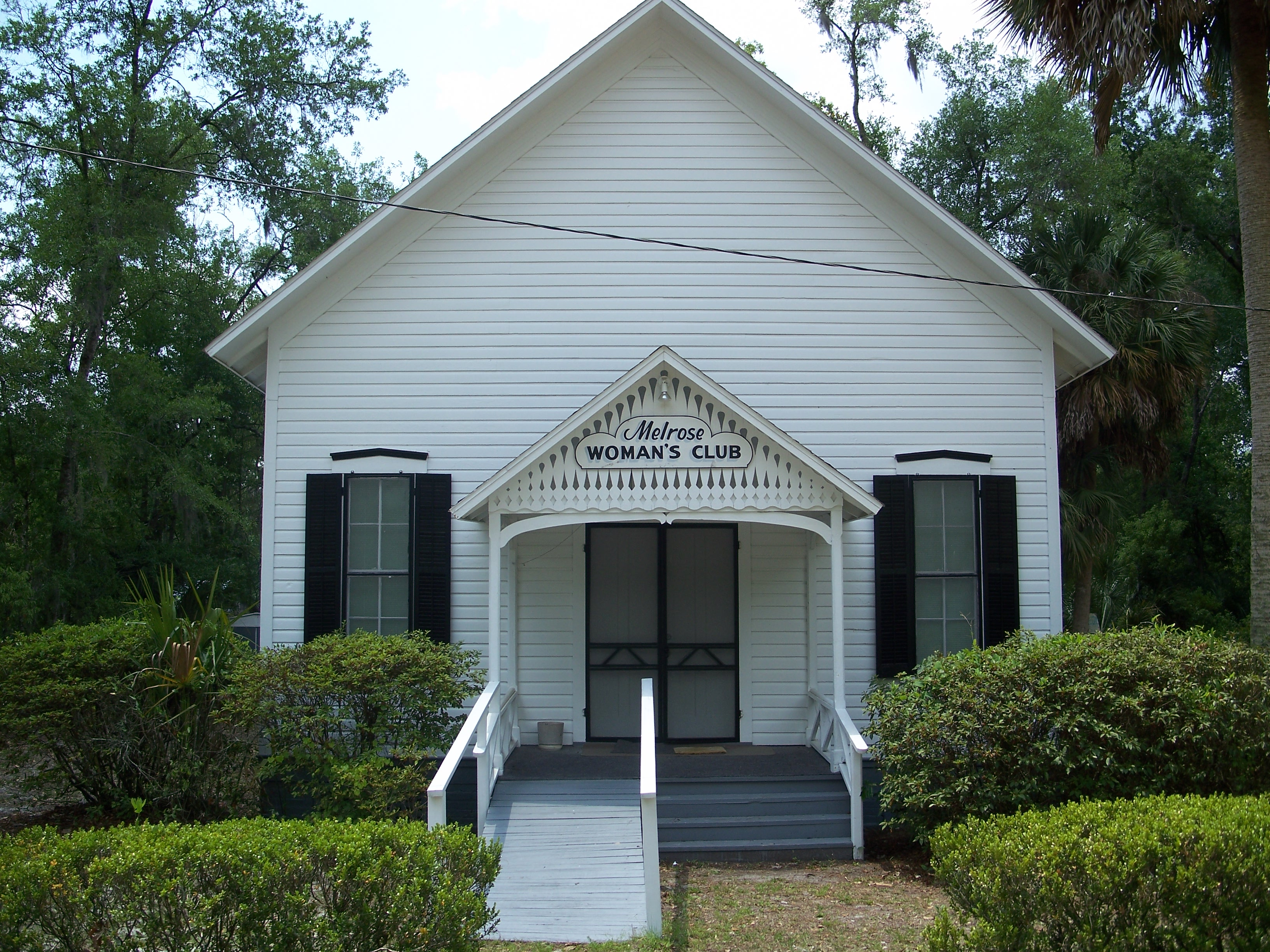

- Location within Florida Location within the United States
- Location: Melrose, Florida
- Coordinates: 29°42′40″N 82°2′49″W
- NRHP reference No.: 78000956
- Added to NRHP: April 6, 1978

The Melrose Woman's Club (also known as The Literary and Debating Society or The Hall) is a historic woman's club in Melrose, Florida. It is located at Pine Street. On April 6, 1978, it was added to the U.S. National Register of Historic Places.

== See also ==
List of Registered Historic Woman's Clubhouses in Florida
