= Coco Plum Woman's Club =

- U.S. National Register of Historic Places
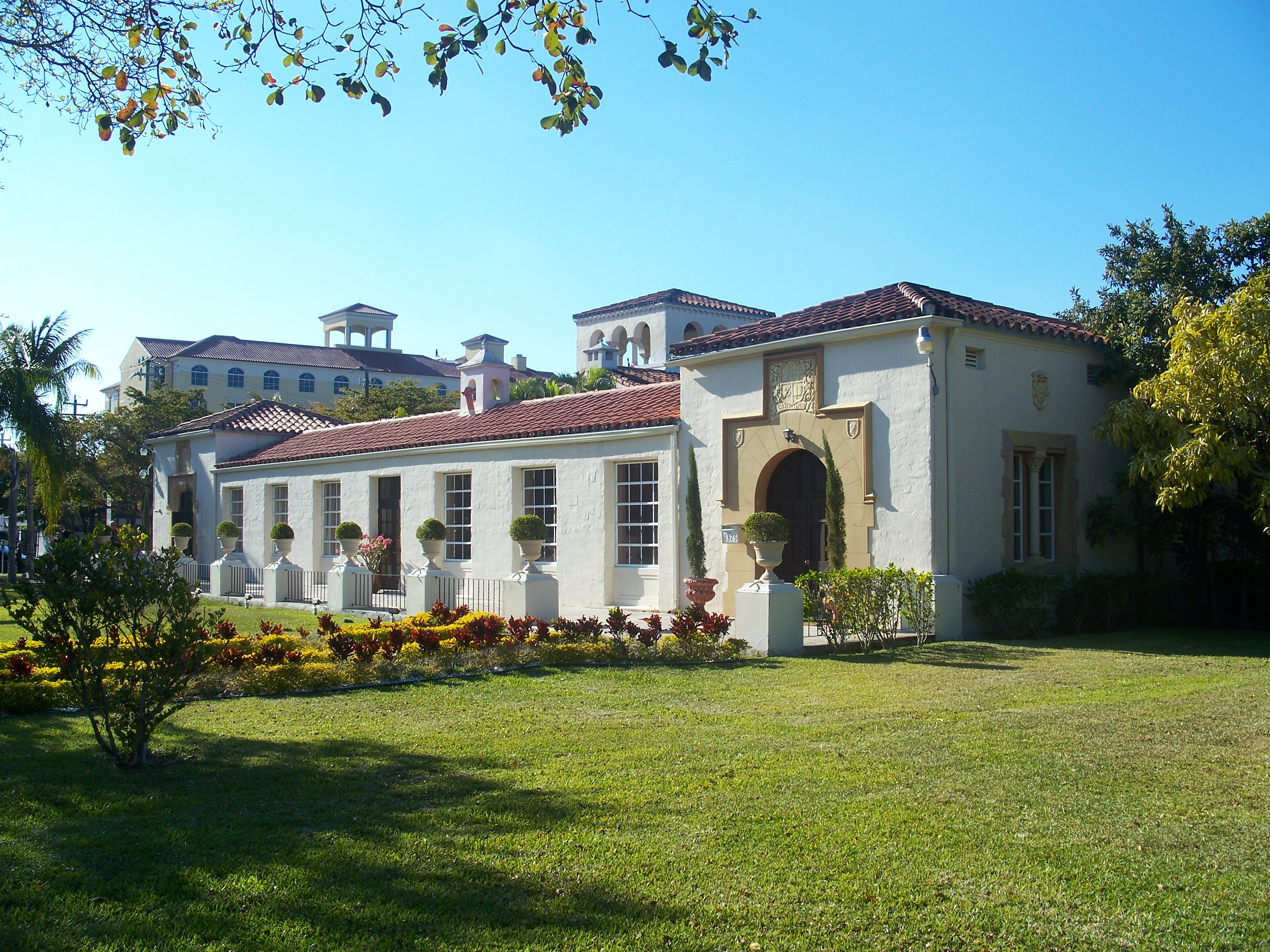

- Location within Miami Location within Florida Location within the United States
- Location: 1375 Sunset Dr. (SW 72nd St.), Coral Gables, Florida
- Coordinates: 25°42′24″N 80°16′49″W
- Area: less than 1 acre (0.40 ha)
- Built: 1926
- Built by: Knight Construction Co.
- Architect: Howard and Early
- Architectural style: Mediterranean Revival
- MPS: Clubhouses of Florida's Woman's Clubs MPS
- NRHP reference No.: 05000598
- Added to NRHP: June 17, 2005

The Coco Plum Woman's Club is a historic women's club located at 1375 Sunset Drive in Coral Gables, Florida. The club was founded in 1912 with eight members; it was named for the local cocoplum fruit. While the club was originally based in one of its members' houses, it built its own clubhouse in 1913. Its historic Mediterranean Revival clubhouse was built in 1926. The club participated in homefront efforts during both World Wars; its work with the American Red Cross during World War II was well-regarded within Florida. During peacetime, the club has served as a community library, a social venue for meetings and dances, a clinic, and a pre-school.

The clubhouse was added to the National Register of Historic Places on June 17, 2005. It is part of the Clubhouses of Florida's Woman's Clubs Multiple Property Submission. The building is currently used as an event hall as well as a clubhouse.
