= Davie Woman's Club =

Historic women's club in Florida

- U.S. National Register of Historic Places
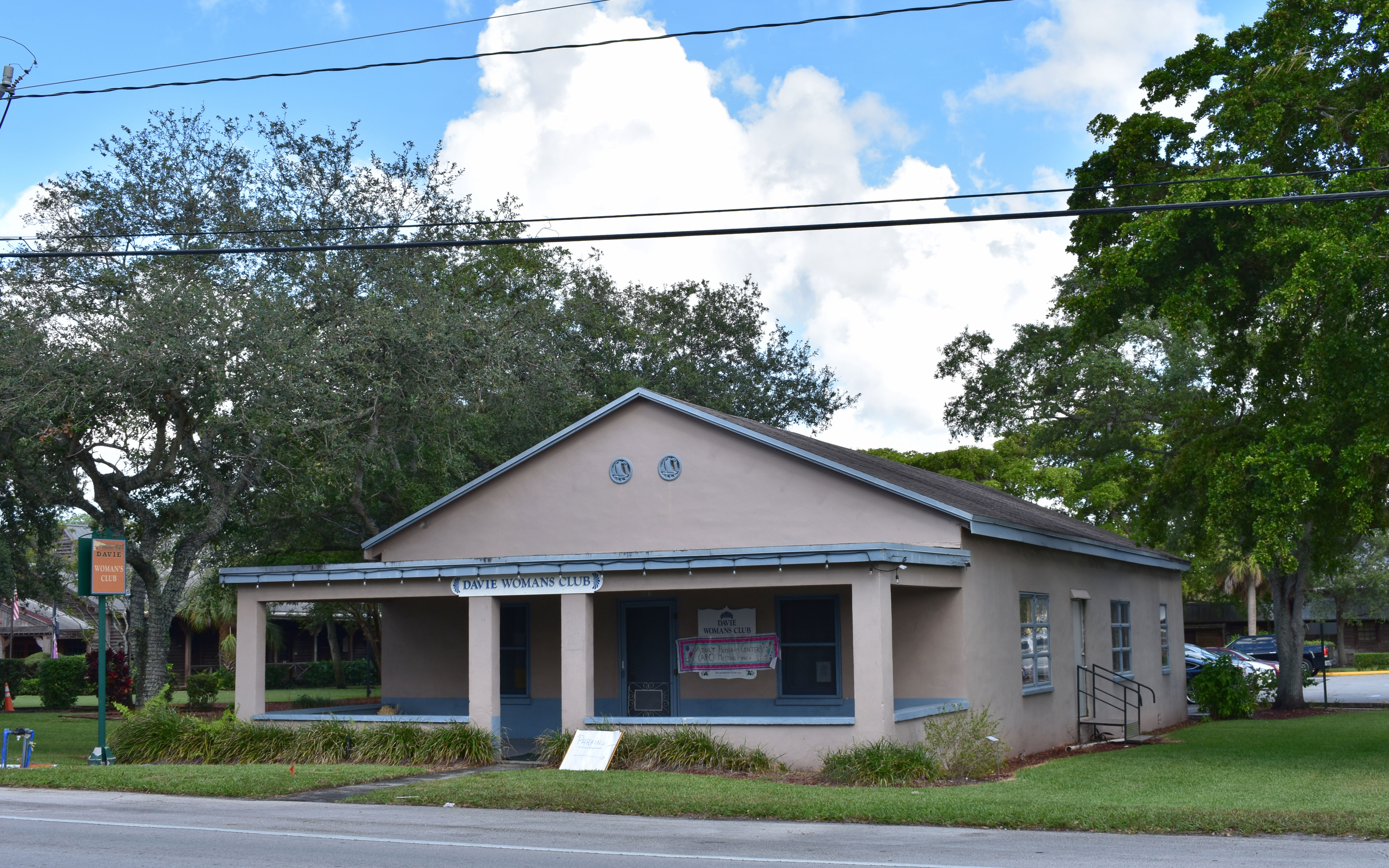
- The clubhouse in 2018

- Location within Florida Location within the United States
- Location: 6551 Orange Drive, Davie, Florida 33314
- Coordinates: 26°03′57″N 80°14′04″W
- Built: 1947 (Club was founded in 1922)
- Website: thedaviewomansclub.com
- MPS: Clubhouses of Florida's Woman's Clubs Multiple Property Submission
- NRHP reference No.: 16000267
- Added to NRHP: May 16, 2016

The Davie Woman's Club is a women's club in Davie, Florida. The club was founded in 1922. The clubhouse building was completed in 1947 and was listed on the National Register of Historic Places in 2016 as part of a Multiple Property Submission.

== History ==
The organization was established in 1922, bought its first building in 1931; moved into the current clubhouse in 1947 which they continue to occupy. In 2011, the Town of Davie celebrated the 50th anniversary of formal municipal incorporation and the club led the effort to select materials for and bury a time capsule to be opened in another 50 years. Today, the group continues to be a meeting place for a variety of organizations and is the oldest women's social servie organization in the area.

== Architecture ==
The group erected the current structure in 1947 because they wanted an up-to-date building large enough to serve the community. The one-story building included ship details in the facades and faces South New River Canal.

== See also ==
- List of women's clubs
- National Register of Historic Places listings in Broward County, Florida
