= St. Petersburg Woman's Club =

- U.S. National Register of Historic Places
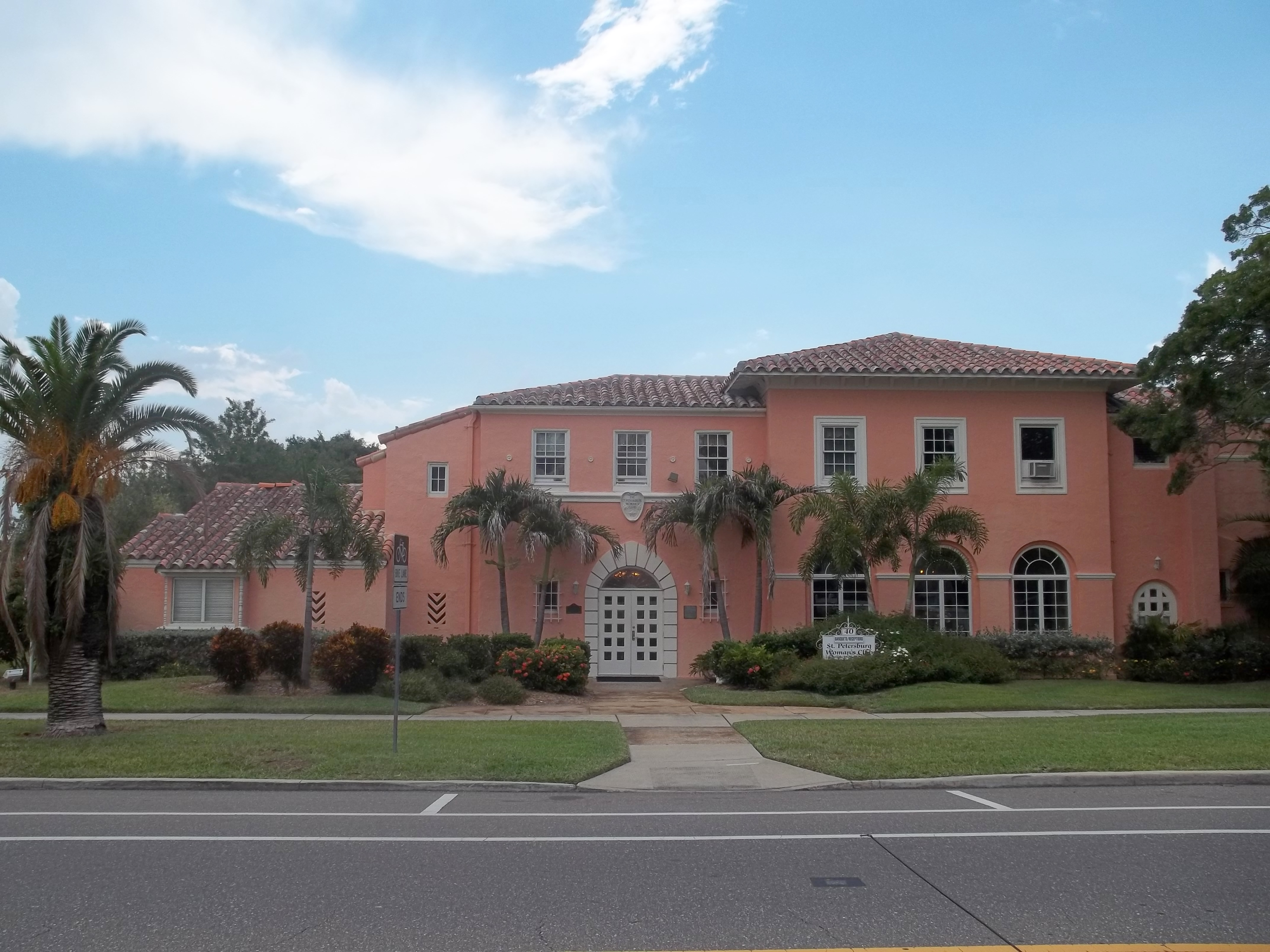

- Location within Florida Location within the United States
- Location: St. Petersburg, Florida
- Coordinates: 27°47′36″N 82°37′33″W
- NRHP reference No.: 94000708
- Added to NRHP: July 15, 1994

The St. Petersburg Woman's Club is a historic woman's club in St. Petersburg, Florida. It is located at 40 Snell Isle Boulevard. On July 15, 1994, it was added to the U.S. National Register of Historic Places.

== History ==
The St. Petersburg Woman's Club was founded on February 7, 1913, by Mrs. Benjamin A. Greene, who had relocated from Evanston, Illinois, where she previously served as president of her local Federated Woman's Club. Under Mrs. Greene's leadership as president, the club held weekly meetings every Thursday afternoon at 3 p.m. at the First Baptist Church. In the same year, the club became a member of the Florida Federation of Women's Clubs. In 1914, the club incorporated and established a permanent meeting place in a building owned by the city.

The club's members began a campaign in 1920 to raise funds for constructing a clubhouse. The campaign raised $5,000 in one year, and the city donated land for the building. The clubhouse was constructed in 1923 at a cost of $25,000.

== Building ==
The clubhouse is a Mediterranean Revival-style building designed by architect Henry Taylor. The building is constructed of hollow tile and stucco, and features a red tile roof, arched windows and doors, and a loggia. The interior of the building includes a large ballroom, a dining room, a kitchen, and several meeting rooms. The building has been used for a variety of events, including dances, concerts, and lectures.

== See also ==
- List of Registered Historic Woman's Clubhouses in Florida
