= Woman's Club of New Smyrna =

- U.S. National Register of Historic Places
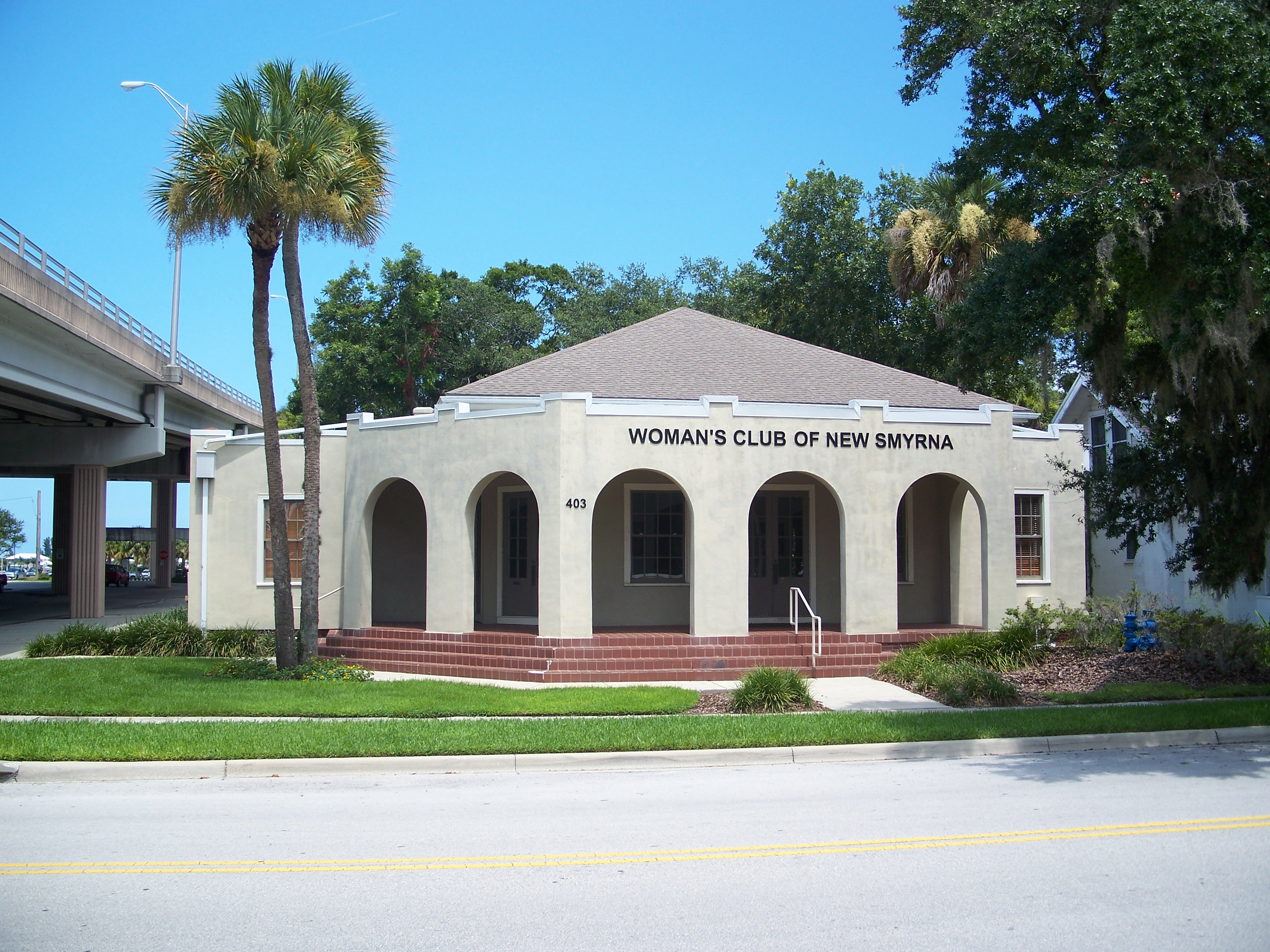

- Location within Volusia County
- Location: New Smyrna Beach, Florida
- Coordinates: 29°1′20″N 80°55′16″W
- Built: 1924, 1934
- NRHP reference No.: 89000410
- Added to NRHP: May 11, 1989

The Woman's Club of New Smyrna is a historic woman's club in New Smyrna Beach, Florida, United States. It is located at 403 Magnolia Street. On May 11, 1989, it was added to the U.S. National Register of Historic Places. It is currently For Sale.

== See also ==
List of Registered Historic Woman's Clubhouses in Florida

== Gallery ==
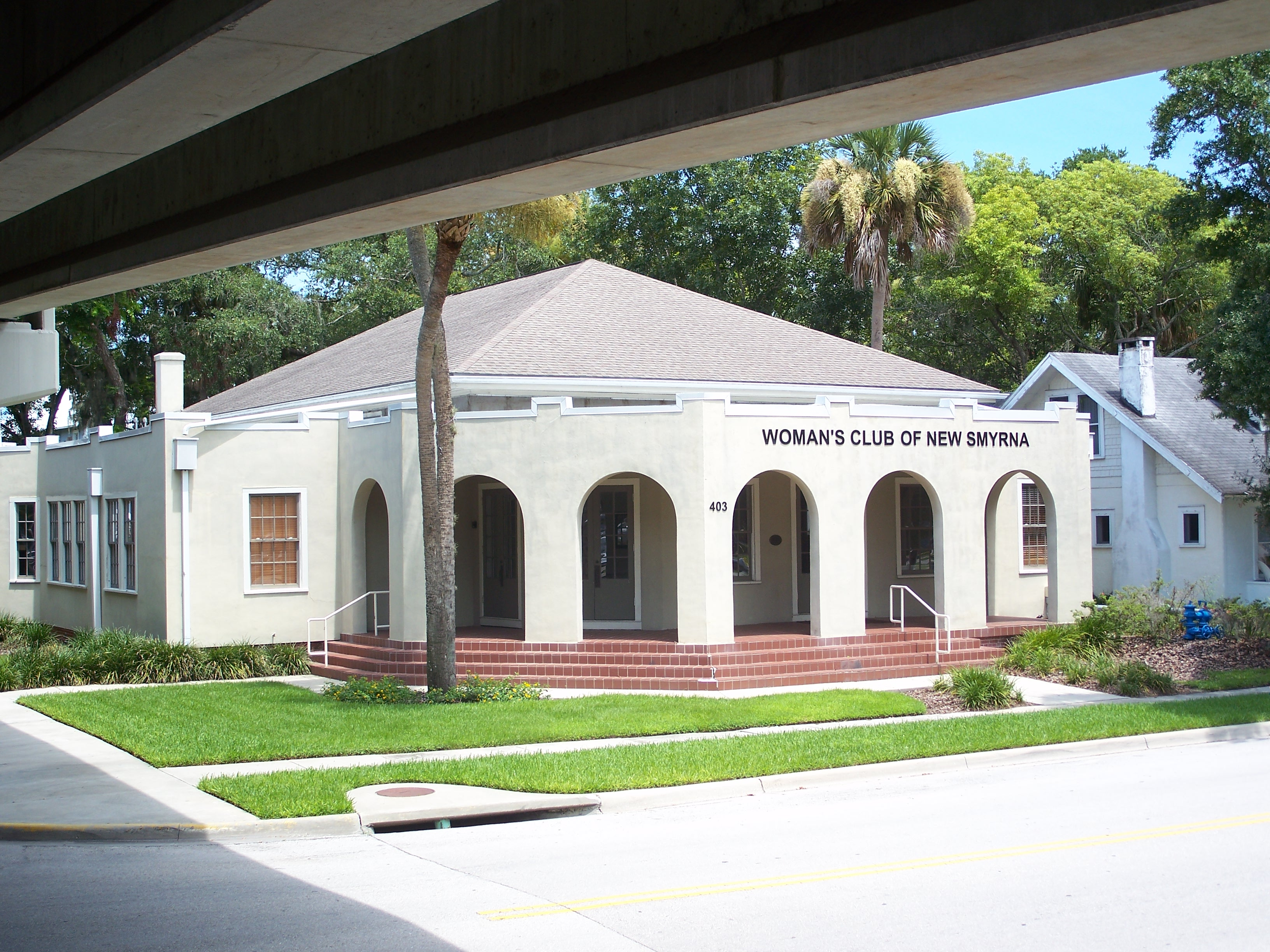

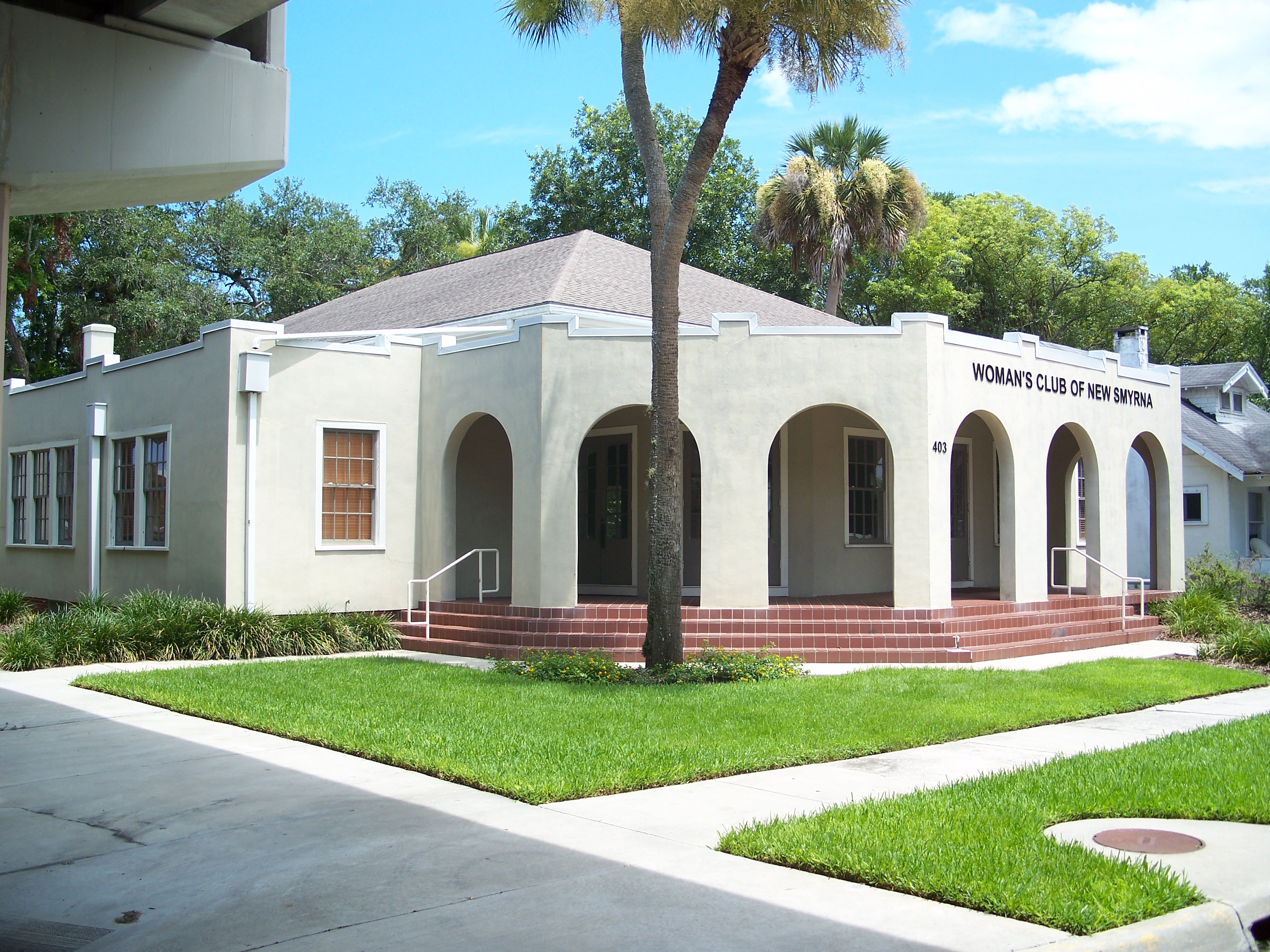

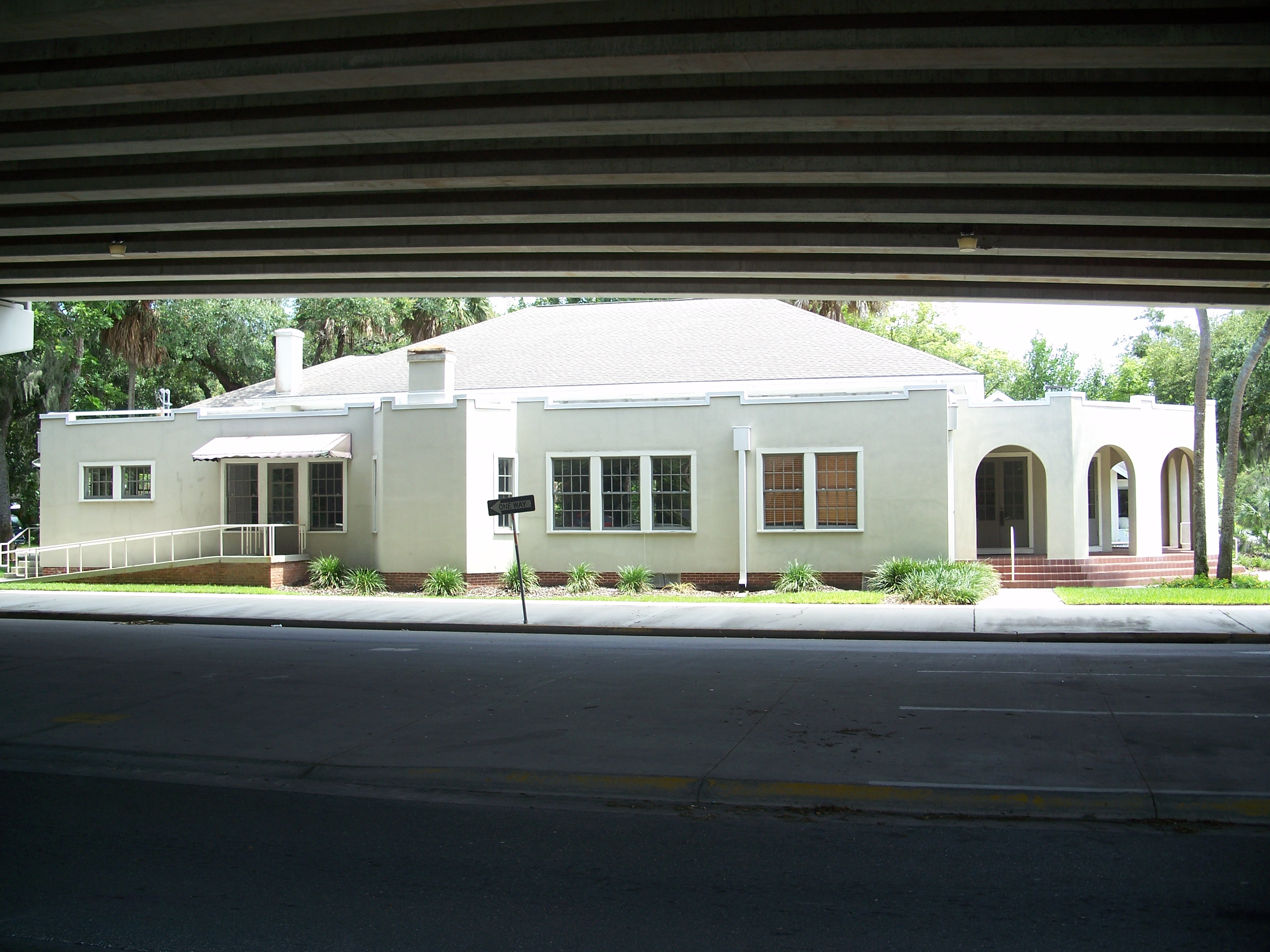
