= Quincy Woman's Club =

- U.S. National Register of Historic Places
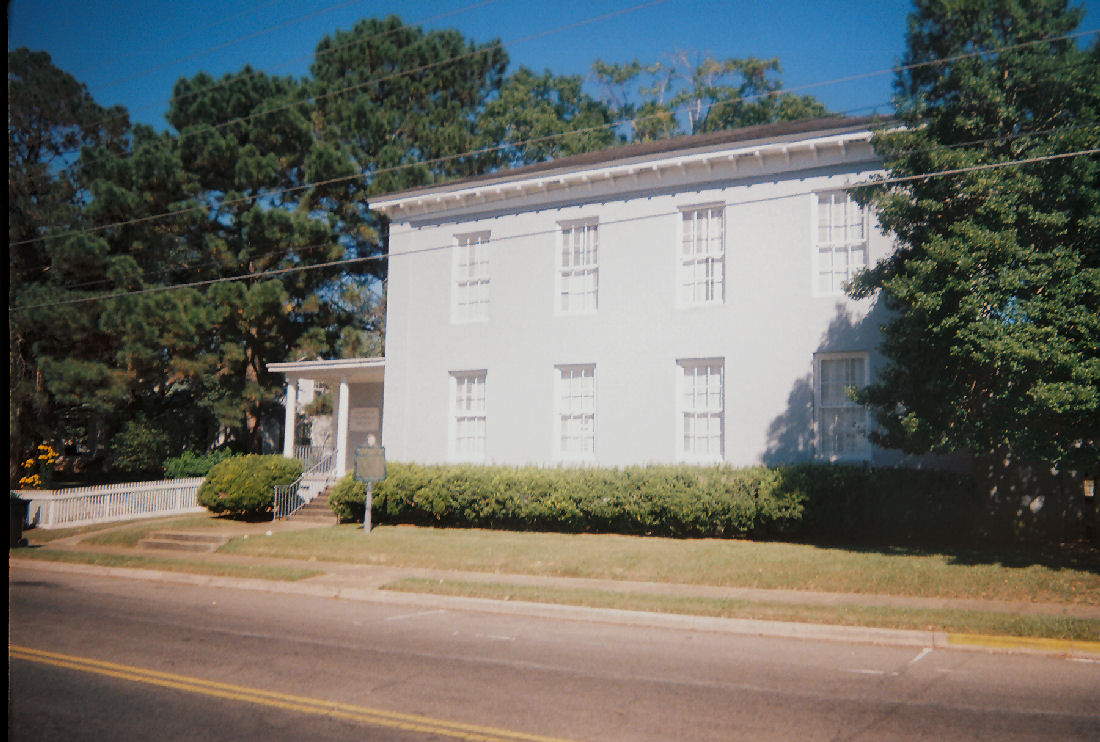

- Location within Florida Location within the United States
- Location: Quincy, Florida
- Coordinates: 30°35′27″N 84°34′51″W
- Built: 1854
- Architectural style: Georgian, Classical Revival, Federal
- NRHP reference No.: 75000555
- Added to NRHP: March 10, 1975

The Quincy Woman's Club (also known as the Old Washington Lodge No. 2) is a historic woman's club in Quincy, Florida, United States. It is located at 300 North Calhoun Street. On March 10, 1975, it was added to the U.S. National Register of Historic Places.

== See also ==
List of Registered Historic Woman's Clubhouses in Florida

== Gallery ==
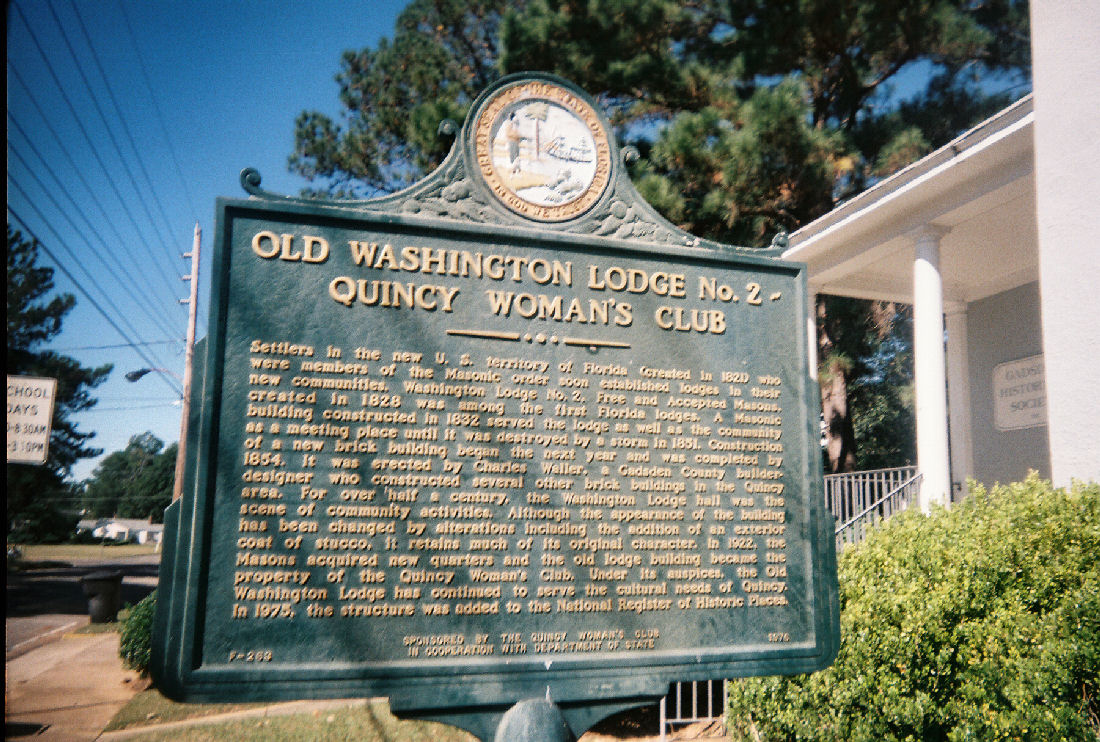
