= Woman's Club of Winter Haven =

- U.S. National Register of Historic Places
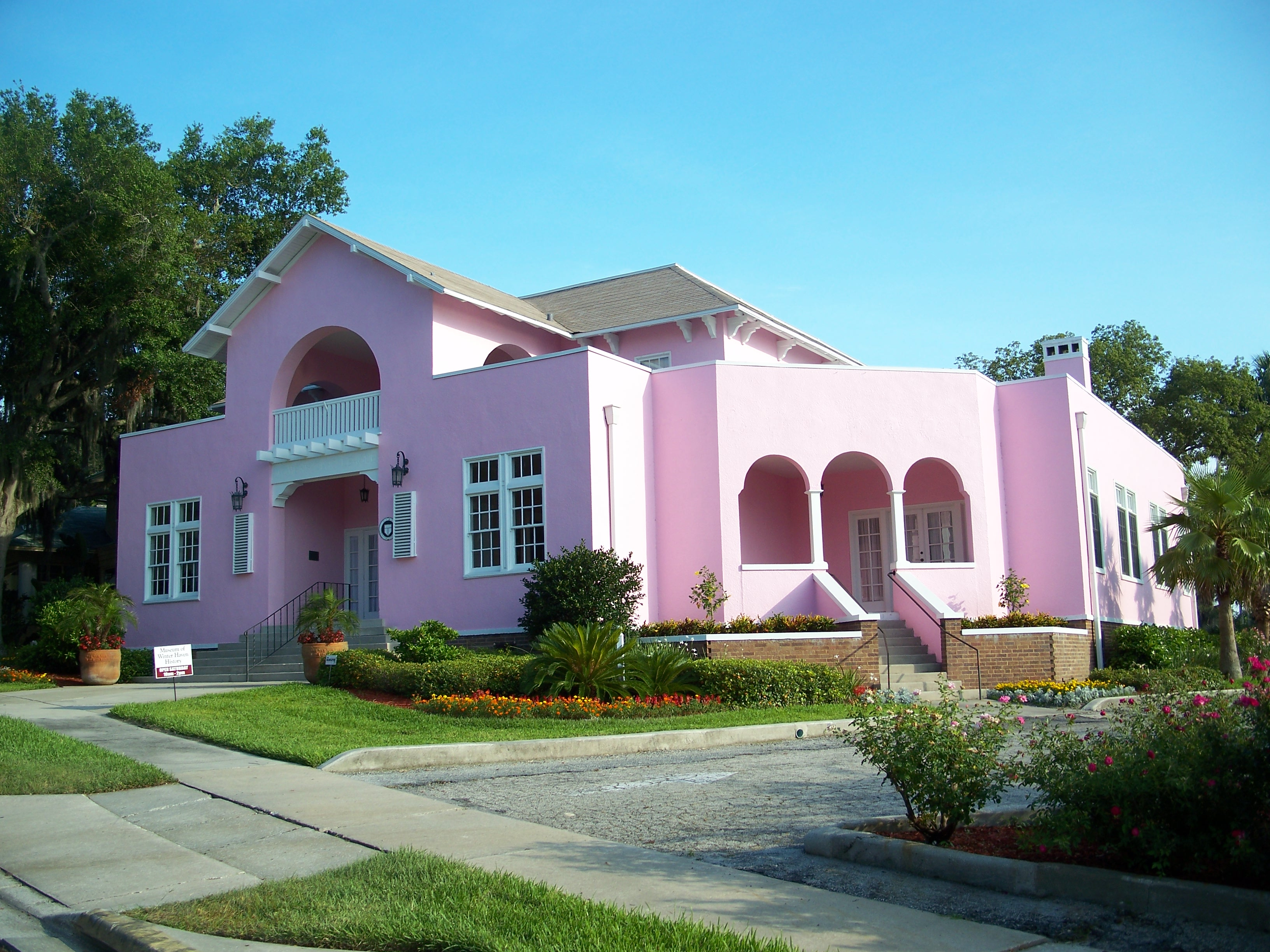

- Location within Florida Location within the United States
- Location: Winter Haven, Florida
- Coordinates: 28°1′29″N 81°44′6″W
- MPS: Clubhouses of Florida's Woman's Clubs MPS
- NRHP reference No.: 98000927
- Added to NRHP: August 10, 1998

The Woman's Club of Winter Haven (also known as the Women's Civic League of Winter Haven and Vicinity Clubhouse) is a historic woman's club in Winter Haven, Florida. It is located at 660 Pope Avenue, Northwest. On August 10, 1998, it was added to the U.S. National Register of Historic Places. Since 2006, it has served as the headquarters of the Museum of Winter Haven History.

== See also ==
List of Registered Historic Woman's Clubhouses in Florida

== Gallery ==
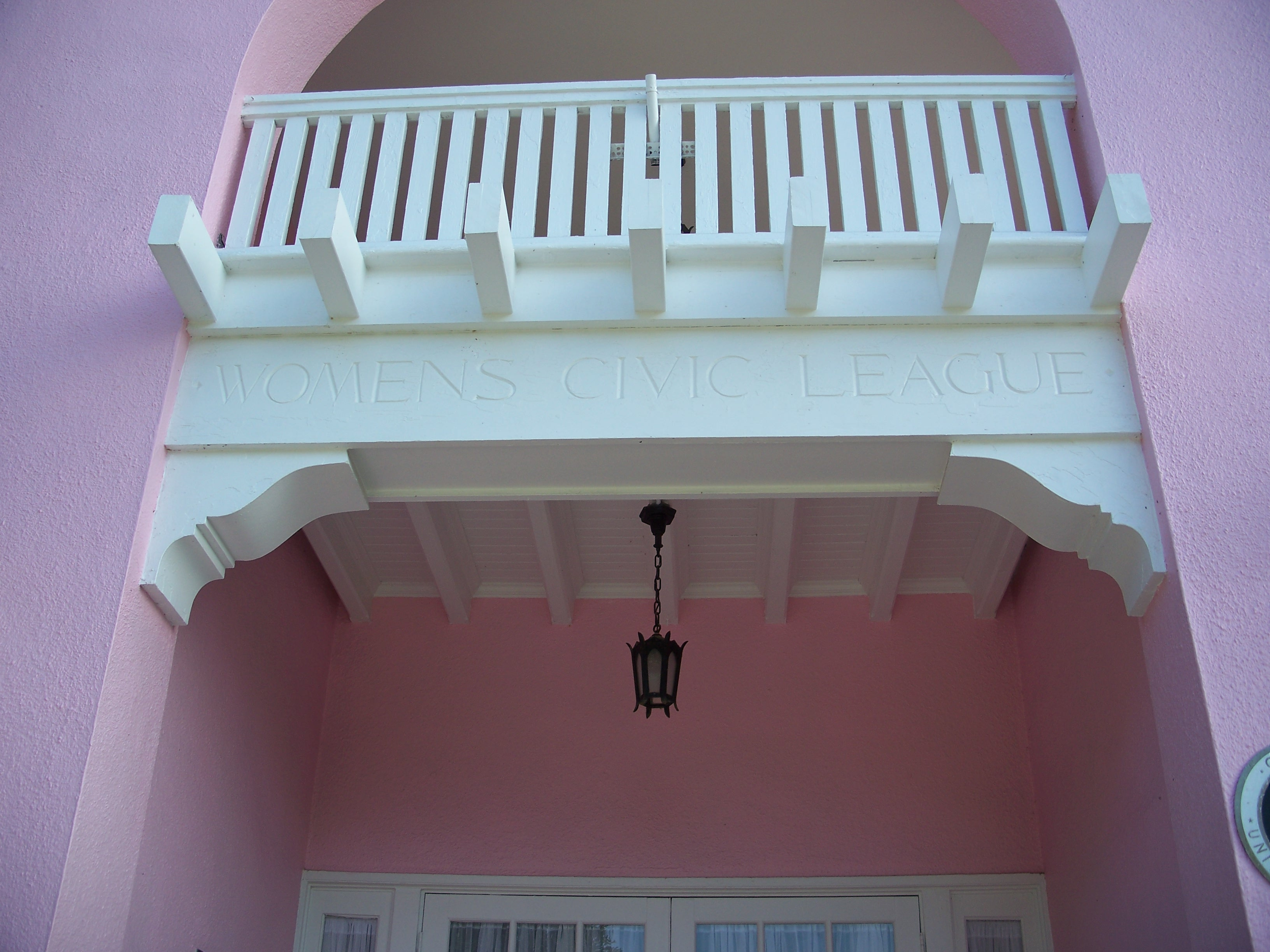

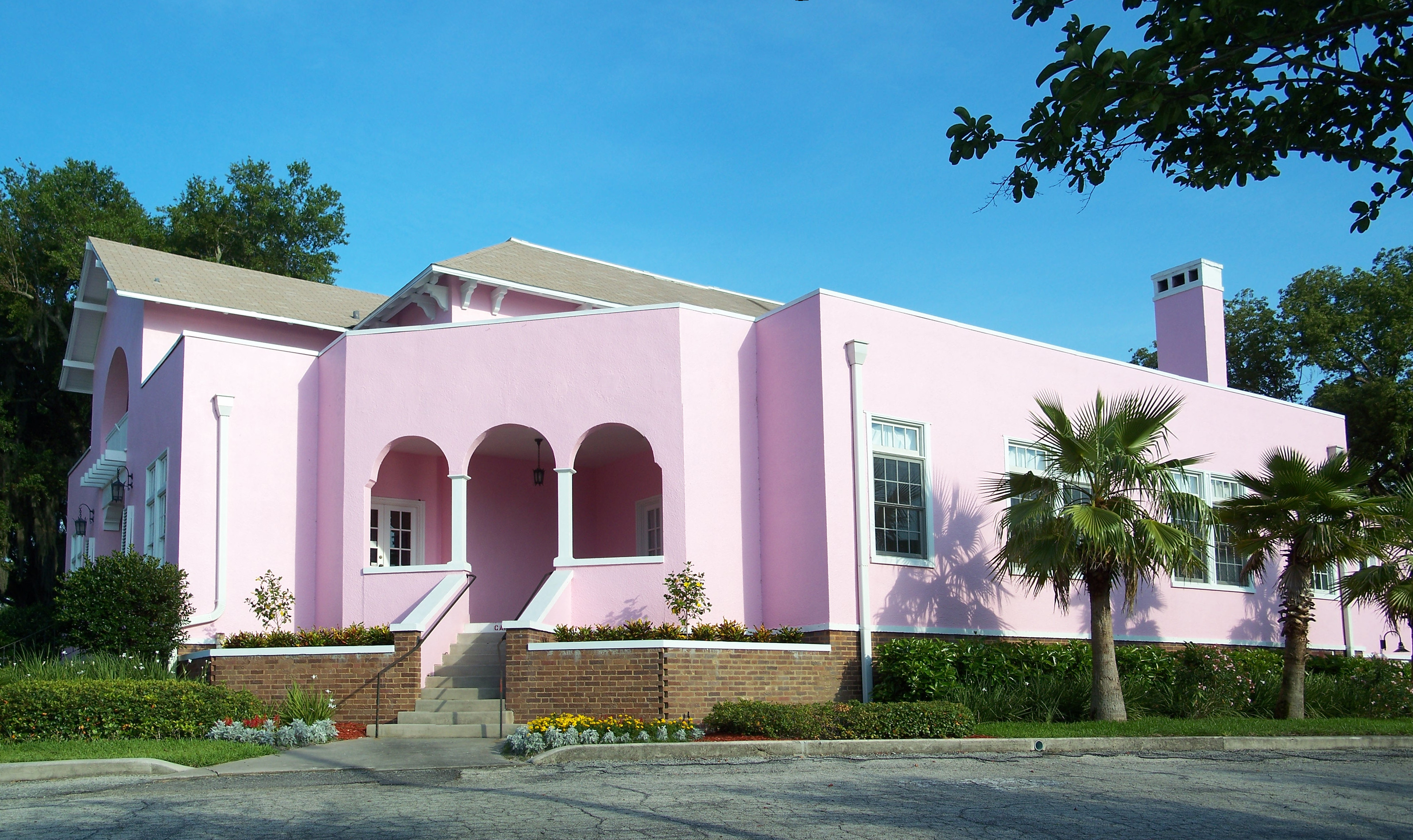

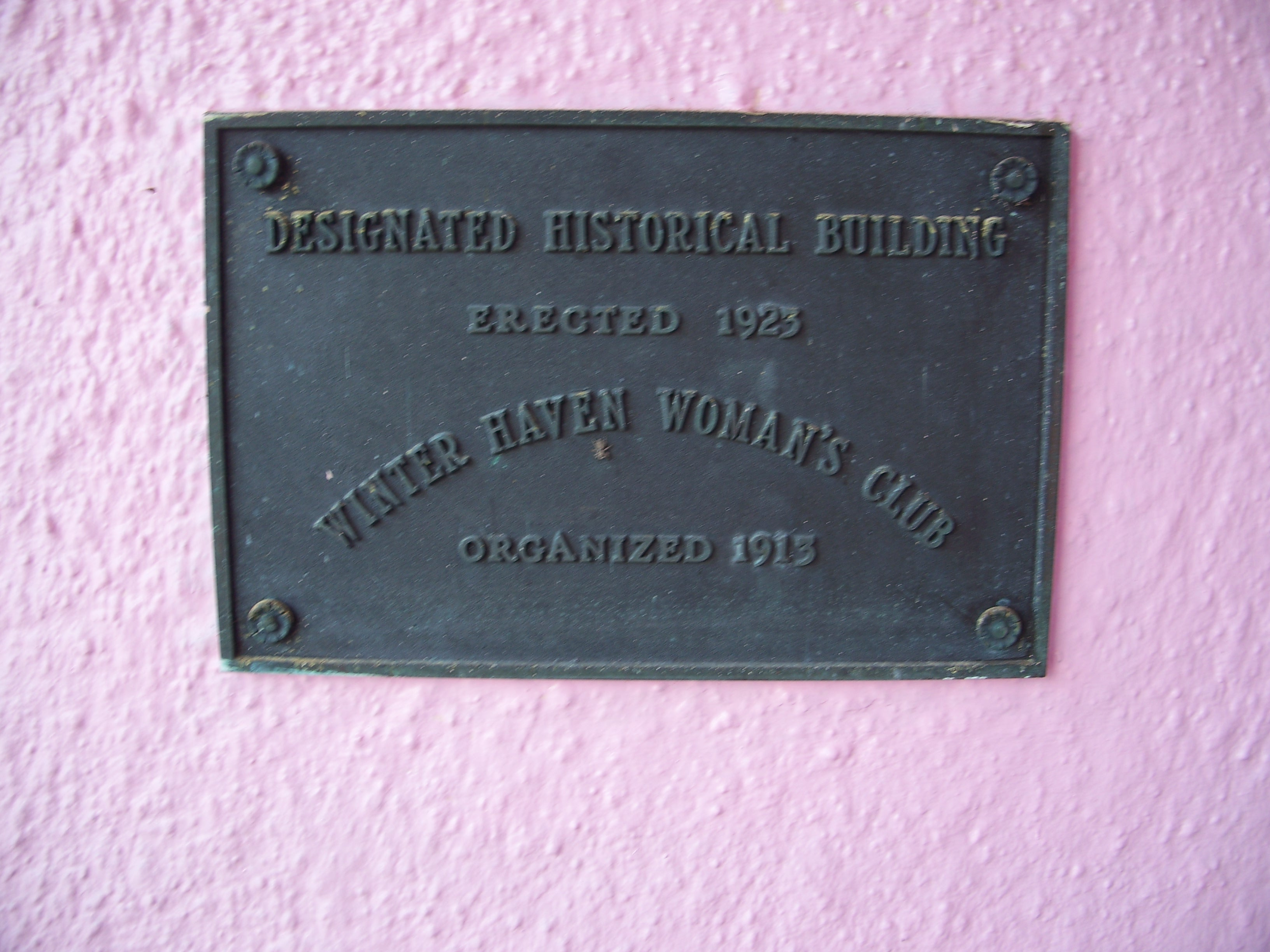

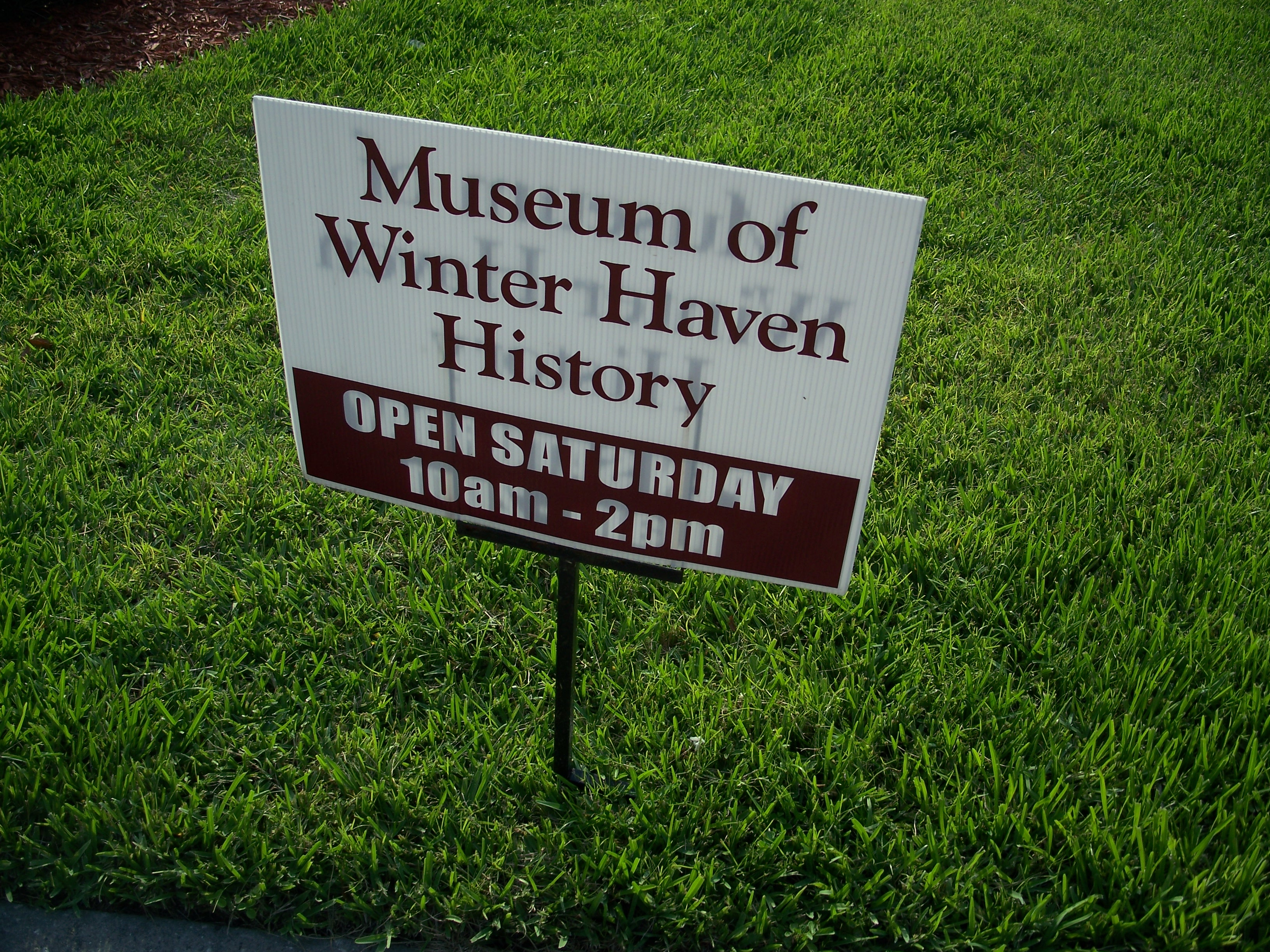

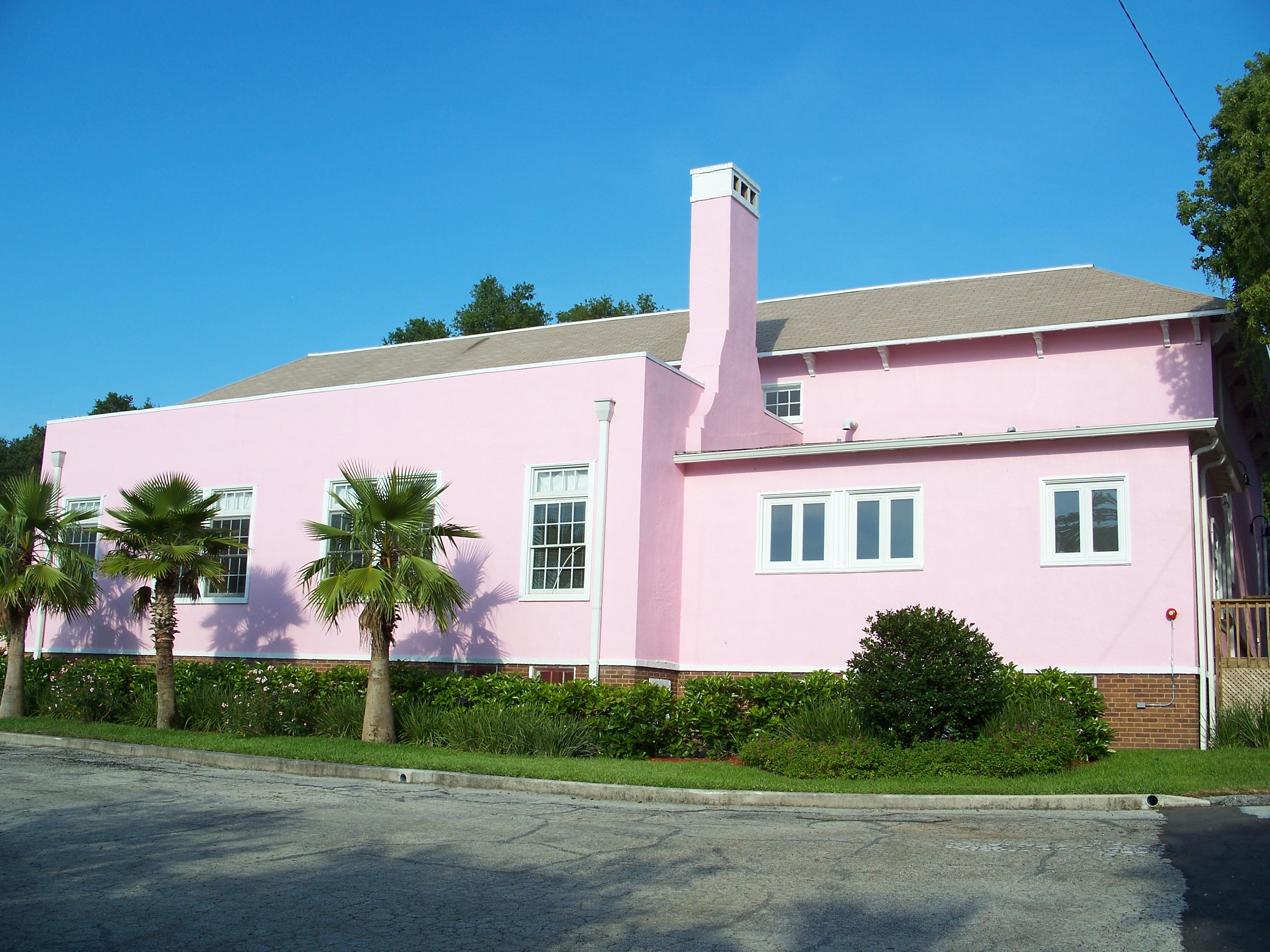
