= List of Woman's Clubhouses in Florida on the National Register of Historic Places =

This is a listing of Woman's Clubhouses in the state of Florida that are on the U.S. National Register of Historic Places.

A number of them were considered for listing in a single study completed in 1998.

== Individual ==
These clubhouses were submitted to the National Register individually, and are so listed there.

Resource name	Also known as	Image	Address	City/county	Added
Babson Park Woman's Club			1300 North Scenic Highway	Babson Park, Polk County	October 17, 1997
Bee Ridge Woman's Club			4919 Andrew Avenue	Sarasota, Sarasota County	February 10, 1995
Boynton Woman's Club			1010 South Federal Highway	Boynton Beach, Palm Beach County	April 26, 1979
Clermont Woman's Club			655 Broome Street	Clermont, Lake County	January 7, 1993
Woman's Club of Coconut Grove	Housekeepers Club		2985 South Bayshore Drive	Miami, Dade County	March 26, 1975
Coral Gables Woman's Club			1001 East Ponce de Leon Boulevard	Coral Gables, Dade County	March 27, 1990
Woman's Club of Eustis			227 North Center Street	Eustis, Lake County	August 5, 1991
Hollywood Woman's Club			501 North 14th Avenue	Hollywood, Broward County	February 10, 1995
Woman's Club of Jacksonville			861 Riverside Avenue	Jacksonville, Duval County	November 3, 1992
Lemon Bay Woman's Club			51 North Maple Street	Englewood, Sarasota County	August 11, 1988
Melrose Woman's Club	The Literary and Debating Society or The Hall		Pine Street	Melrose, Putnam County	April 6, 1978
Woman's Club of New Smyrna			403 Magnolia Street	New Smyrna Beach, Volusia County	May 11, 1989
Ormond Beach Woman's Club	Anderson-Price Memorial Library Building		42 North Beach Street	Ormond Beach, Volusia County	January 26, 1984
Woman's Club of Palmetto			910 Sixth Street West	Palmetto, Manatee County	March 6, 1986
Punta Gorda Woman's Club			118 Sullivan Street	Punta Gorda, Charlotte County	April 5, 1991
Quincy Woman's Club	Old Washington Lodge No. 2		300 North Calhoun Street	Quincy, Gadsden County	March 10, 1975
Sarasota Woman's Club	Florida State Theatre		1241 North Palm Avenue	Sarasota, Sarasota County	January 18, 1985
St. Petersburg Woman's Club			40 Snell Isle Boulevard	St. Petersburg, Pinellas County	July 15, 1994
Woman's Club of Starke			201 North Walnut Street	Starke, Bradford County	April 18, 1997
Woman's Club of Tallahassee			1513 Cristobal Drive	Tallahassee, Leon County	November 18, 1987
Vero Beach Woman's Club			1534 21st Street	Vero Beach, Indian River County	February 10, 1995
Woman's Club of Winter Park			419 Interlachen Avenue	Winter Park, Orange County	May 4, 1995

== Clubhouses of Florida's Woman's Clubs MPS ==
- Clubhouses of Florida's Woman's Clubs
- U.S. National Register of Historic Places
- Location: Florida
- NRHP reference No.: 64500099
- Added to NRHP: August 10, 1998

The following buildings were added to the National Register of Historic Places as part of the Clubhouses of Florida's Woman's Clubs Multiple Property Submission (or MPS).

Resource name	Also known as	Image	Address	City/county	Added
Bradenton Woman's Club			1705 Manatee Avenue West	Bradenton, Manatee County	February 4, 2019
Woman's Club of Chipley			607 Fifth Street	Chipley, Washington County	December 8, 1997
Coco Plum Woman's Club			1375 Sunset Drive (Southwest 72nd Street)	Coral Gables, Dade County	December 17, 2005
Dade City Woman's Club			37922 Palm Avenue	Dade City, Pasco County	October 12, 2003
Davie Woman's Club			6551 Southwest 45th Street	Dade City, Broward County	October 12, 2003
Fort Lauderdale Woman's Club	Woman's Civic Improvement Association		20 South Andrews Avenue	Fort Lauderdale, Broward County	February 4, 2019
Lake Butler Woman's Club	Old Union County Courthouse		285 Northeast 1st Avenue	Lake Butler, Union County	December 23, 2003
Lloyd Woman's Club	Lloyd Home Demonstration Club		Bond Street	Lloyd, Jefferson County	August 10, 1998
Terra Ceia Village Improvement Association Hall	Terra Ceia Woman's Club		1505 Center Road	Terra Ceia, Manatee County	September 16, 2003
Woman's Club of Ocoee			10 North Lakewood Avenue	Ocoee, Orange County	February 14, 2011
Woman's Club of Winter Haven	Women's Civic League of Winter Haven and Vicinity Clubhouse		660 Pope Avenue, Northwest	Winter Haven, Polk County	August 10, 1998

== Other ==
At least one women's club is listed as a contributing building in a National Register historic district.

Resource name	Also known as	Image	Address	City/county	Added
Zephyrhills Woman's Club				Zephyrhills, Pasco County	

== See also ==
- List of women's club buildings
