= Woman's Club of Starke =

- U.S. National Register of Historic Places
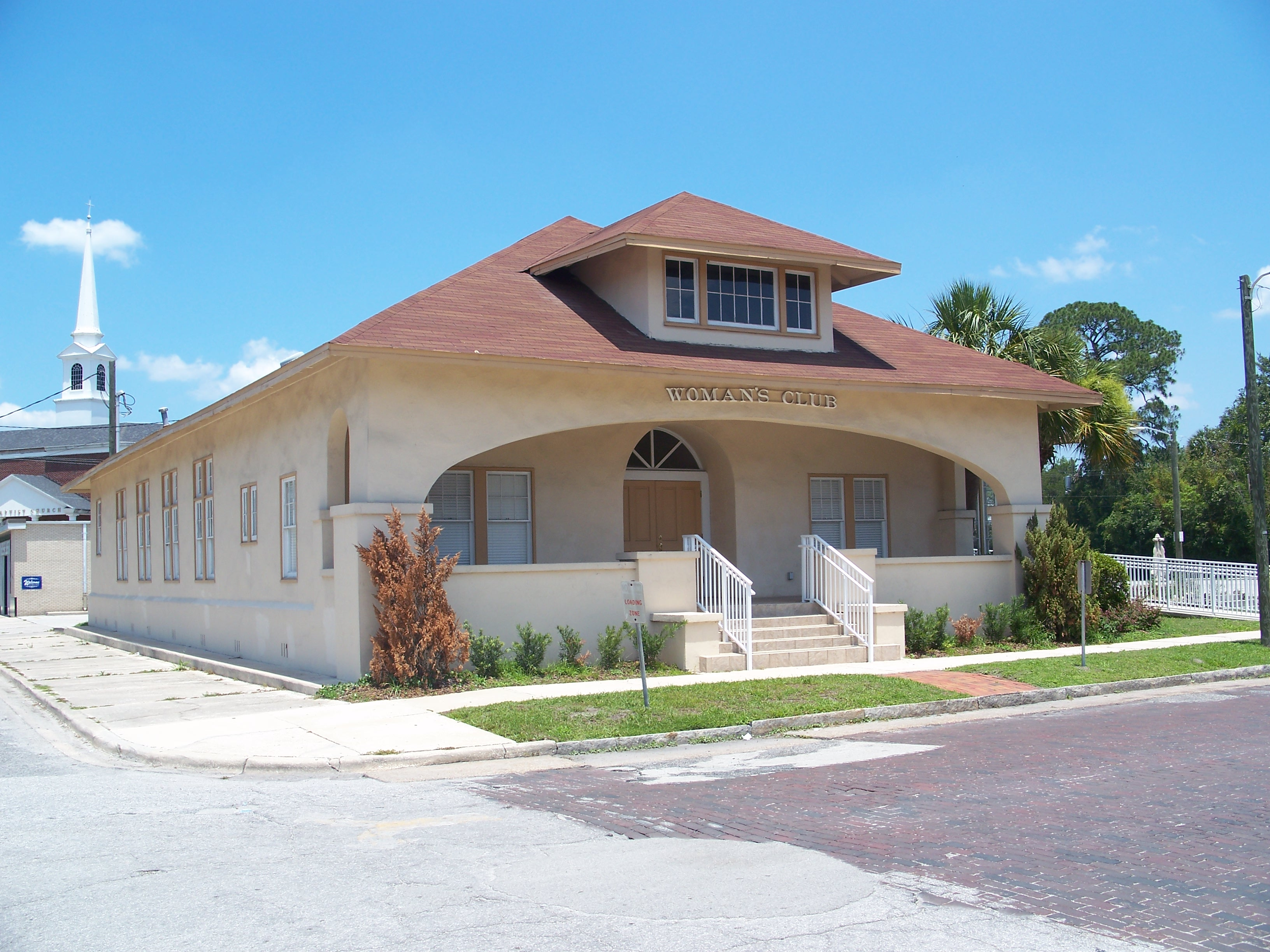

- Location within Florida Location within the United States
- Location: Starke, Florida
- Coordinates: 29.94502°N 82.10966°W
- NRHP reference No.: 97000350
- Added to NRHP: April 18, 1997

The Woman's Club of Starke is a historic woman's club in Starke, Florida, located at 201 North Walnut Street. On April 18, 1997, it was added to the U.S. National Register of Historic Places.

== History ==
The original building was leased for 99 years to the Woman's Club of Starke by the "board of public instruction" in January 1921. The new and current building on the site opened on November 3, 1922, built at a cost of $10,000. Portions of the building were used by the Bradford County Library in 1936, and in 1941 the building was turned over to soldiers of Camp Blanding for their use, and was later used by the United Service Organizations and the Army YMCA.

A historical marker was placed at the site in 2009. The building remains in use by the Woman's Club of Starke, with preserving the building now being a part of their mission.
