= Babson Park Woman's Club =

- U.S. National Register of Historic Places
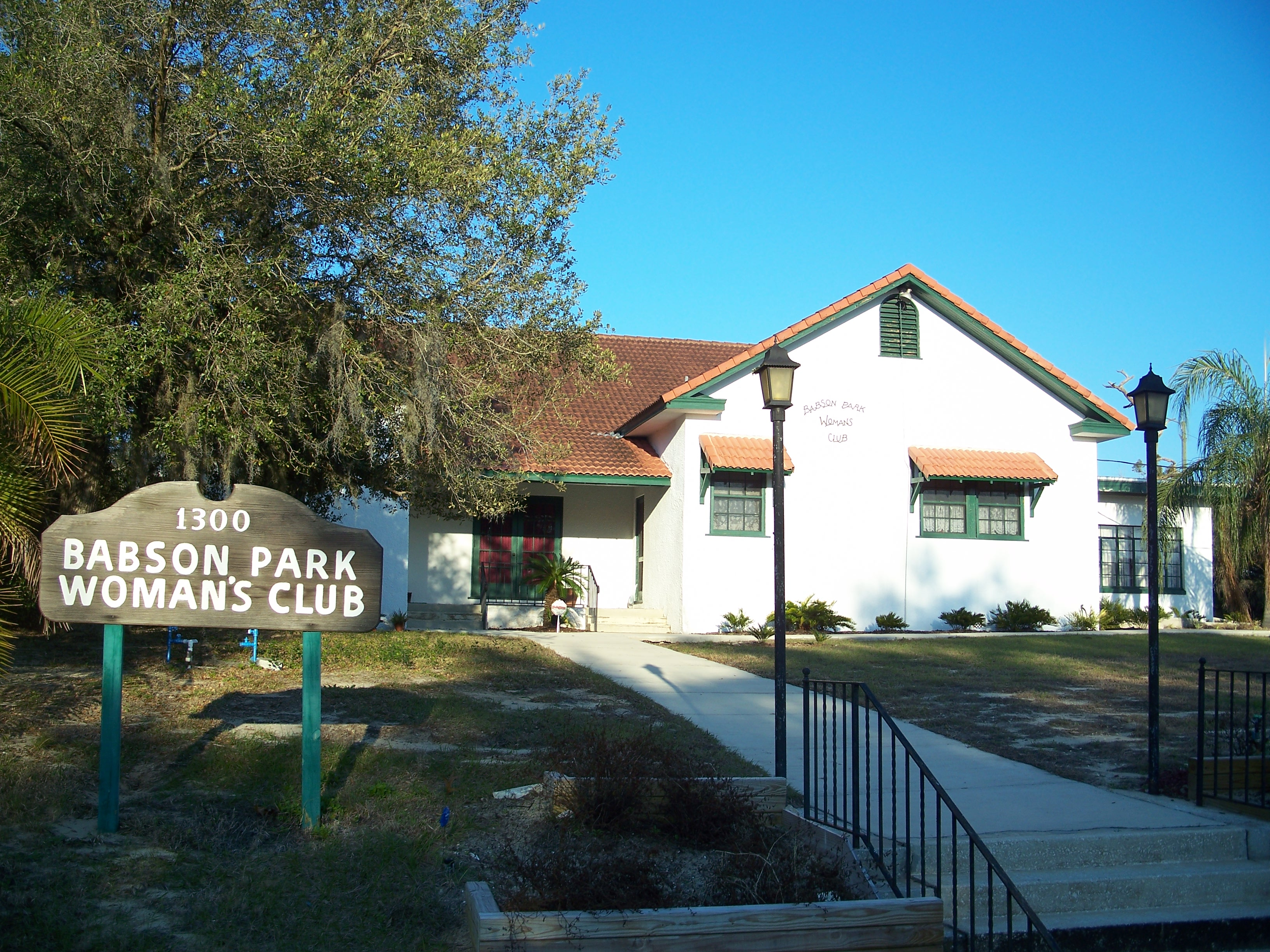

- Location within Florida Location within the United States
- Location: Babson Park, Florida
- Coordinates: 27°50′21″N 81°31′50″W
- NRHP reference No.: 97001229
- Added to NRHP: October 17, 1997

The Babson Park Woman's Club is a historic woman's club in Babson Park, Florida. It is located at 1300 North Scenic Highway. On October 17, 1997, it was added to the U.S. National Register of Historic Places.

== See also ==
List of Registered Historic Woman's Clubhouses in Florida
