= Woman's Club of Eustis =

- U.S. National Register of Historic Places
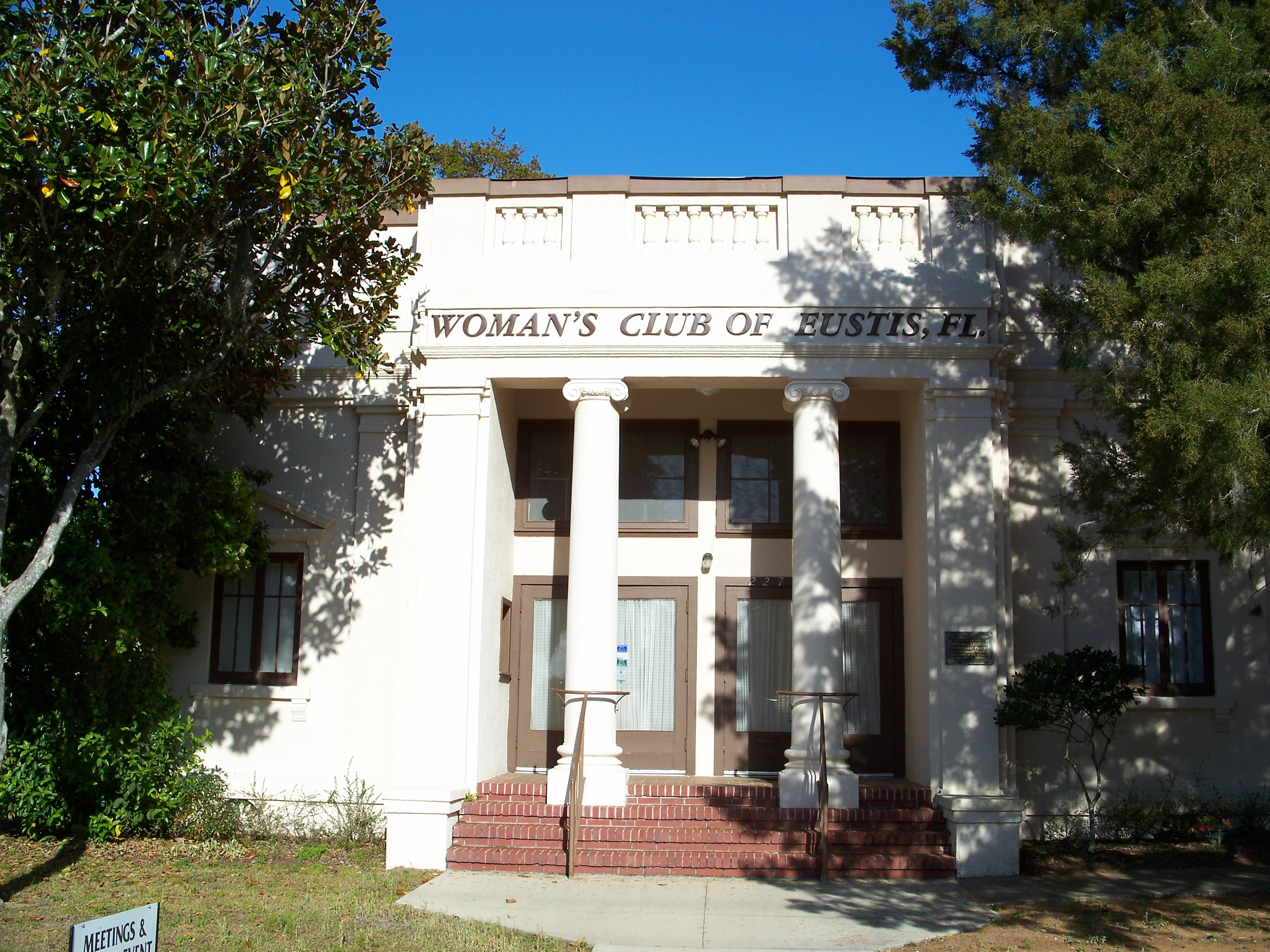

- Location within Florida Location within the United States
- Location: Eustis, Florida
- Coordinates: 28°51′15″N 81°40′52″W
- Architectural style: Classical Revival
- NRHP reference No.: 91001006
- Added to NRHP: August 5, 1991

The Woman's Club of Eustis is a historic woman's club in Eustis, Florida, United States. It is located at 227 North Center Street. On August 5, 1991, it was added to the U.S. National Register of Historic Places.

== See also ==
List of Registered Historic Woman's Clubhouses in Florida

== Gallery ==
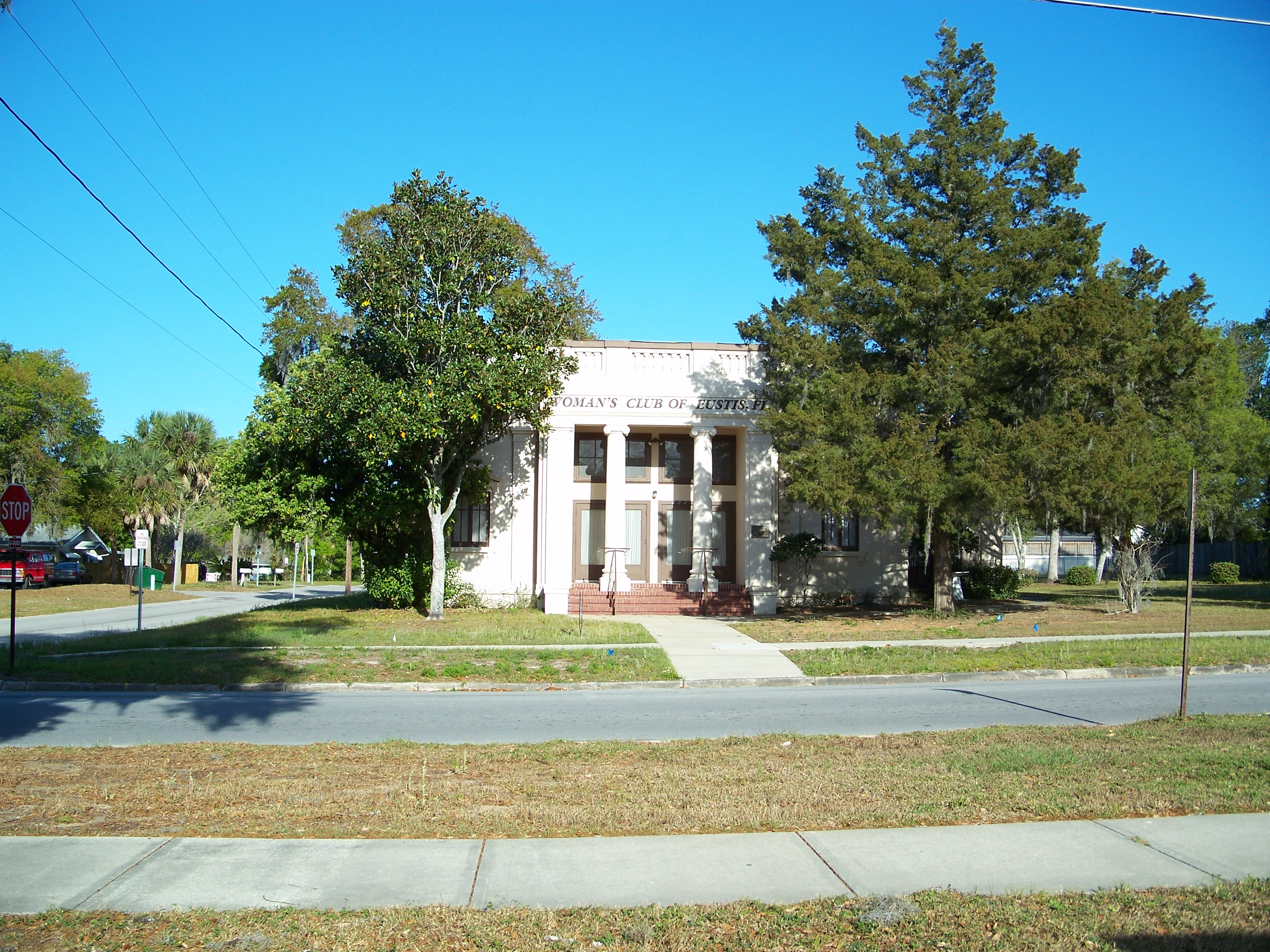

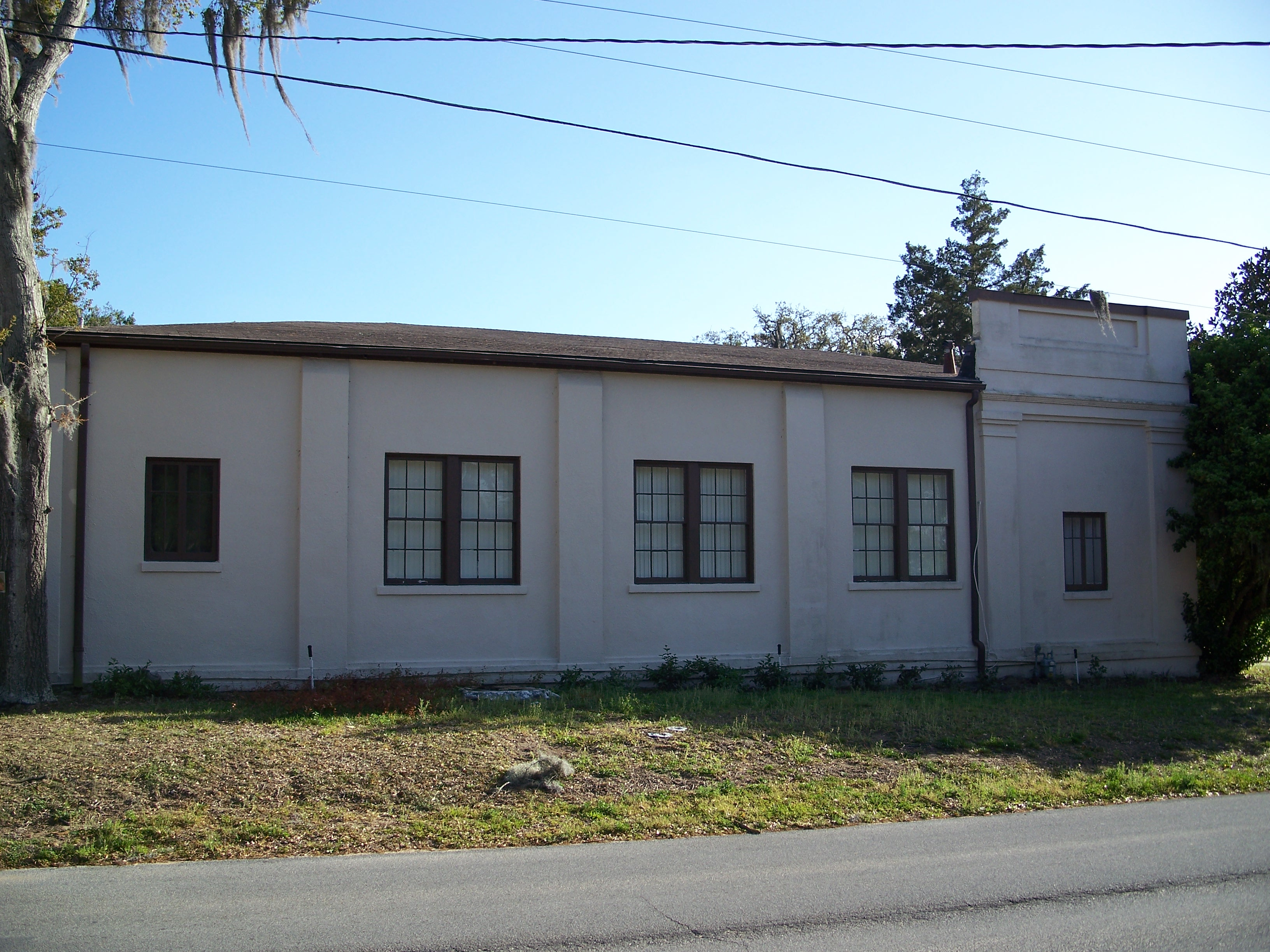

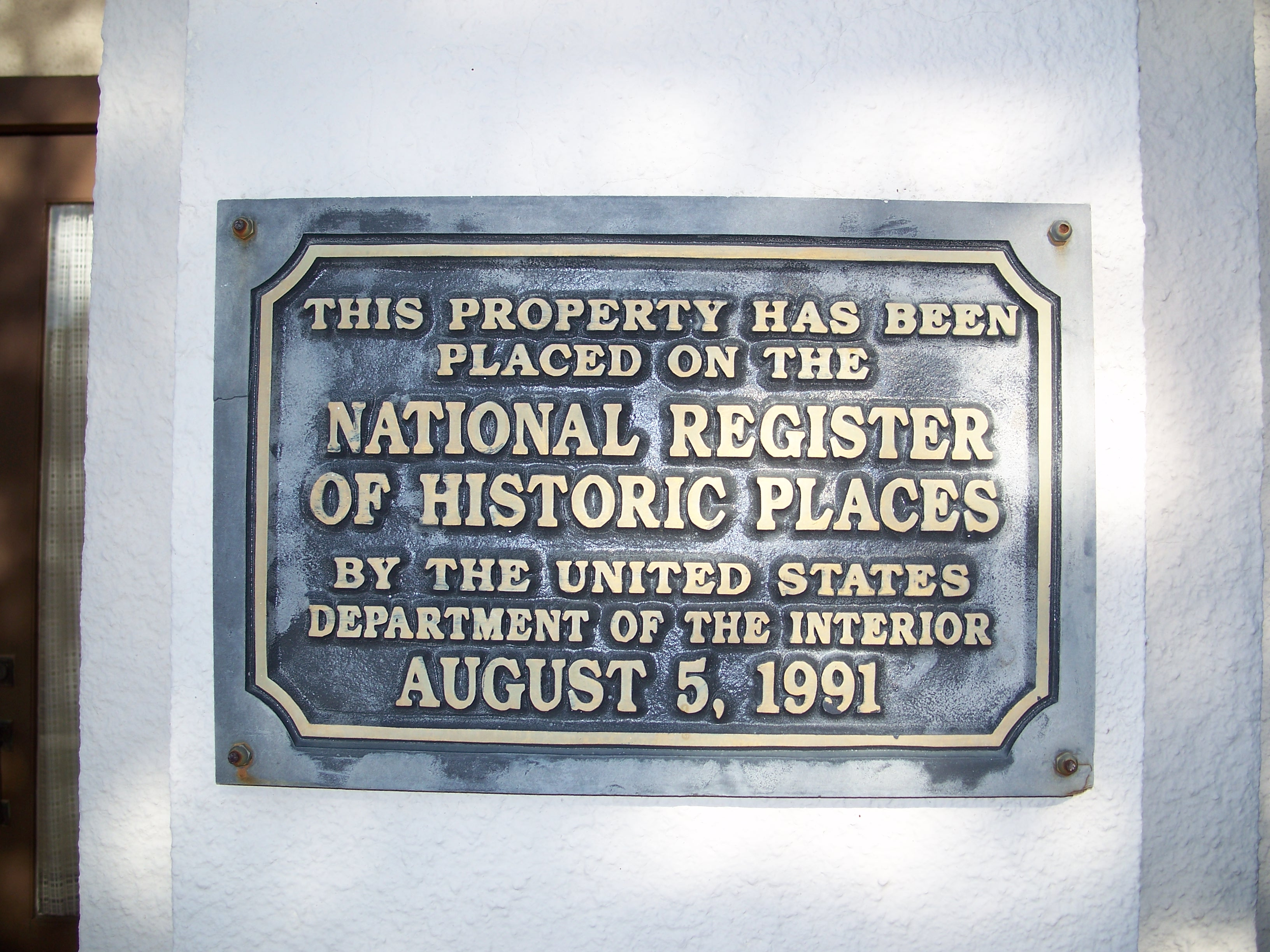
