= Snell Isle =

Neighborhood of St. Petersburg, Florida, United States

Coordinates: 27.79621°N 82.62024°W

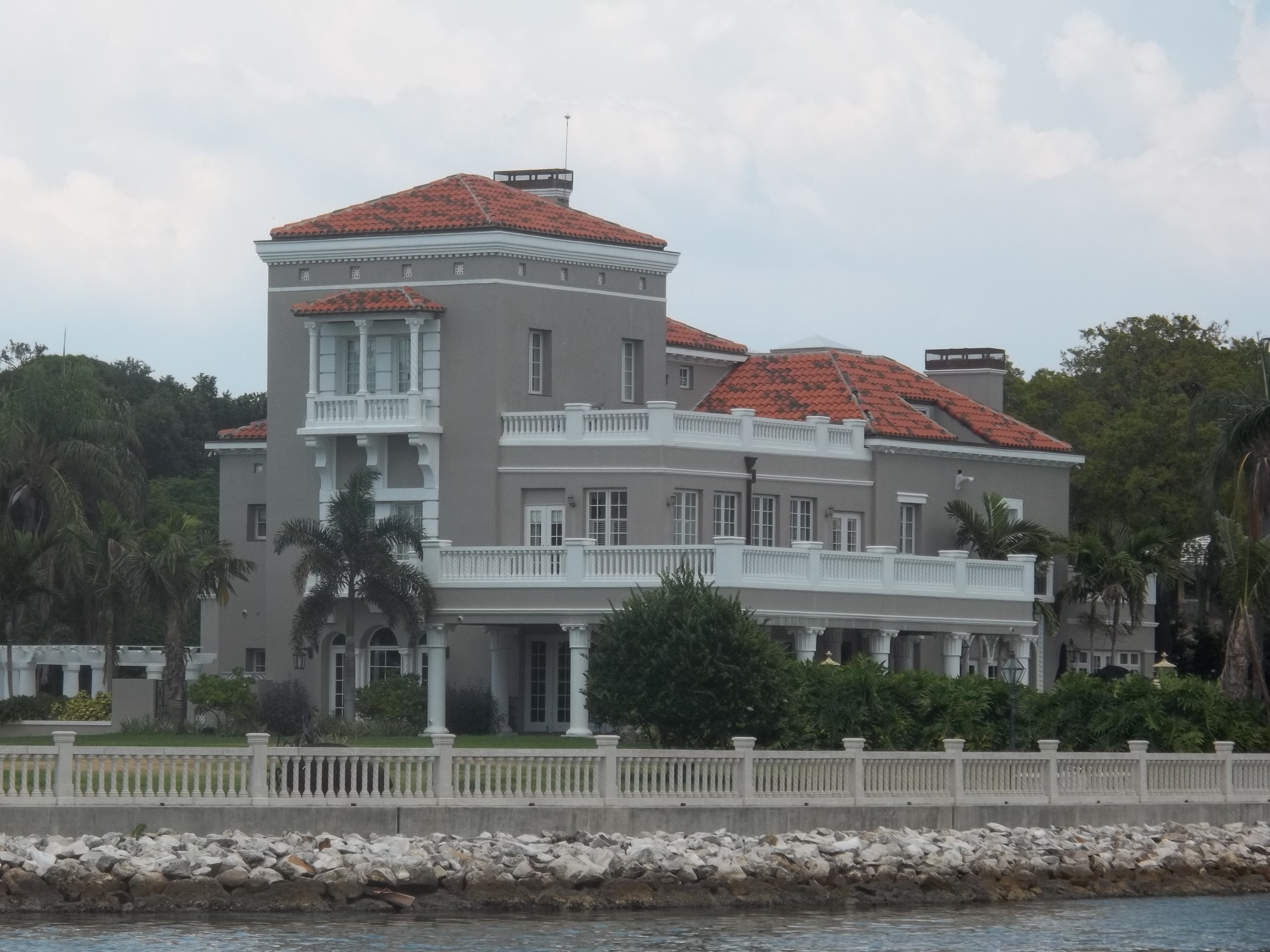
Snell's residence on the Isle

Snell Isle is a neighborhood in St. Petersburg, Florida, United States that centers on Snell Isle Boulevard. The street is named after local developer C. Perry Snell (1869–1942), a Kentucky druggist who moved to St. Petersburg in 1900 and began buying properties he developed into upscale residential neighborhoods, commercial buildings, and public parks. He was the driving force behind the creation and emergence of the Snell Isle neighborhood in the 1920s. According to an article in Tampa Bay Magazine,

When the development, originally a muddy mangrove island, officially opened in October 1925, only 39 of its 275 acres were above the high tide line. Even so, Snell quickly sold over seven million dollars' worth of lots there.

In 1926, Snell also opened on Snell Isle what is now called the Renaissance Vinoy Golf Club and Resort, listed on the National Register of Historic Places. A memorial is dedicated to him in Snell Isle Park.

Snell Isle is also home to St. Petersburg Woman's Club. C. Perry Snell built the Women's Club on Coffee Pot Bayou to give a location to what he considered the city's strongest and most important organization.
