= Clermont Woman's Club =

- U.S. National Register of Historic Places
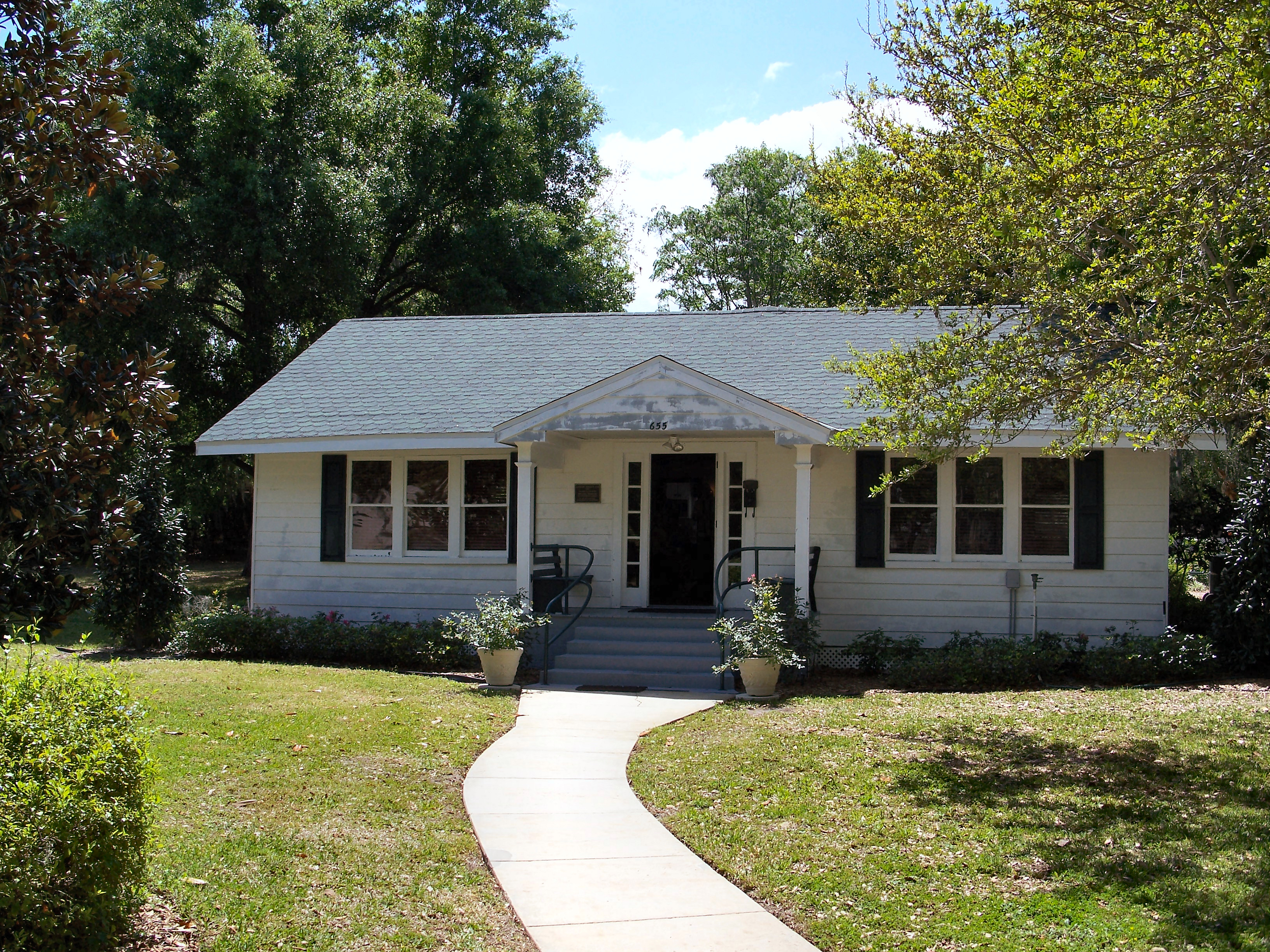

- Location within Florida Location within the United States
- Location: Clermont, Florida
- Coordinates: 28°33′6″N 81°45′59″W
- NRHP reference No.: 92001747
- Added to NRHP: January 7, 1993

The Clermont Woman's Club is a historic woman's club in Clermont, Florida, United States. It was organized in 1921.

The club is housed in an 1880s former one-room schoolhouse located at 655 Broome Street. On January 7, 1993, the building was added to the U.S. National Register of Historic Places.

== See also ==
List of Registered Historic Woman's Clubhouses in Florida
