= Dade City Woman's Club =

- U.S. National Register of Historic Places
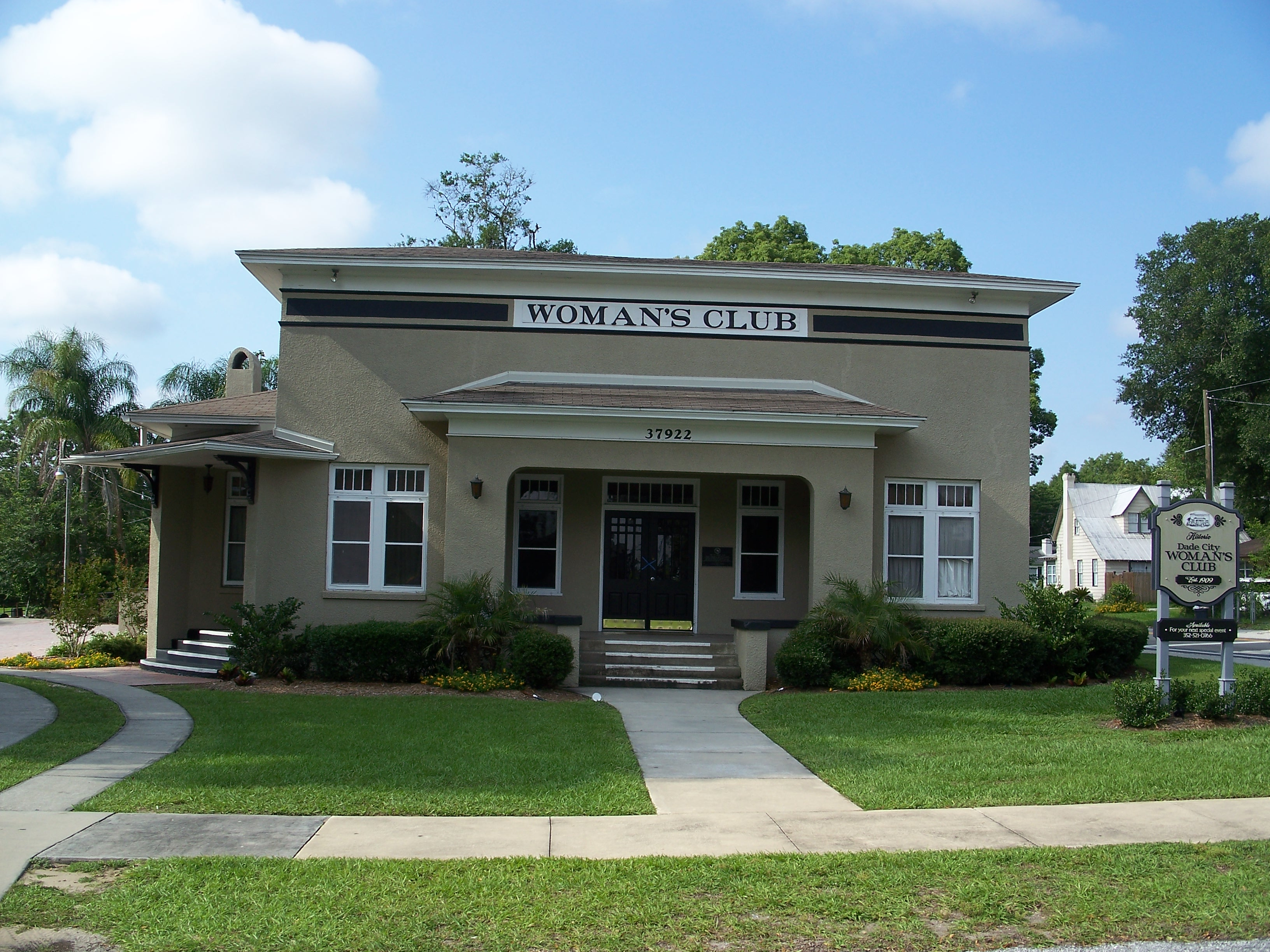

- Location within Florida Location within the United States
- Location: 37922 Palm Ave., Dade City, Florida
- Coordinates: 28°21′31″N 82°11′20″W
- Area: 0.1 acres (0.040 ha)
- Built: 1926
- Architectural style: Prairie School
- MPS: Clubhouses of Florida's Woman's Clubs MPS
- NRHP reference No.: 03001014
- Added to NRHP: October 13, 2003

The Dade City Woman's Club is a historic women's club building located at 37922 Palm Avenue in Dade City, Florida. Built in 1926, the building has a Prairie School design with Mediterranean Revival influences. The interior includes meeting rooms, dining rooms, and a stage, all typical features of women's clubs of the era. The club hosted both meetings and local events such as school dances and political debates.

The building was added to the National Register of Historic Places on October 13, 2003. It is part of the Clubhouses of Florida Woman's Clubs Multiple Property Submission.
