= Hollywood Woman's Club =

Historic women's club in Hollywood, Florida

Hollywood Women's Club

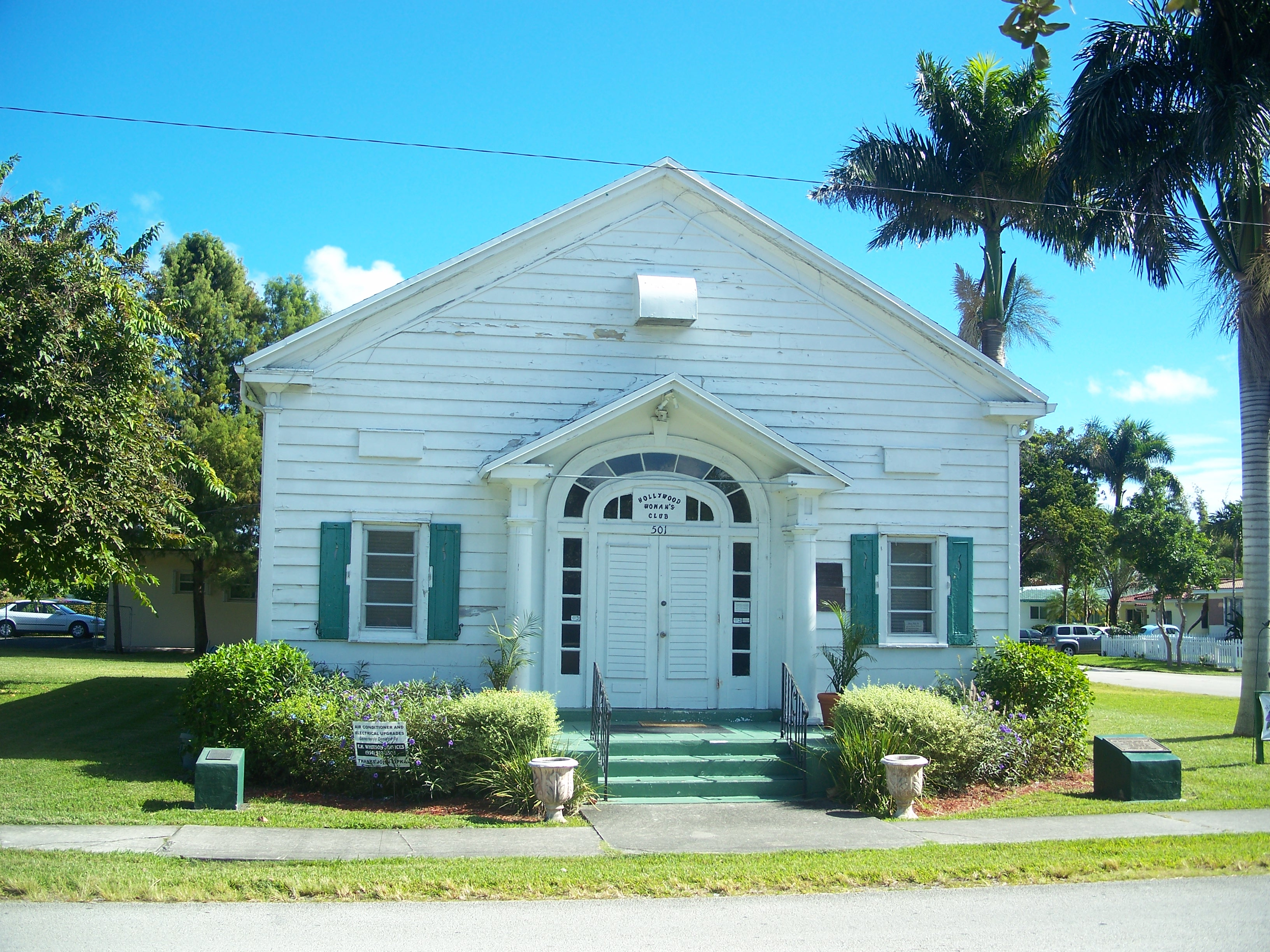
- Front entrance of clubhouse

- Location within Florida Location within the United States
- Abbreviation: HWC
- Formation: 1922
- Type: Women's club
- Legal status: 501c3
- Location(s): 501 North Fourteenth Avenue Hollywood, Florida 33020, United States
- Coordinates: 26°0′55″N 80°8′3″W
- Website: hollywoodwomensclub.org
- Formerly called: Hollywood Woman's Club
- Hollywood Woman's Club
- U.S. National Register of Historic Places
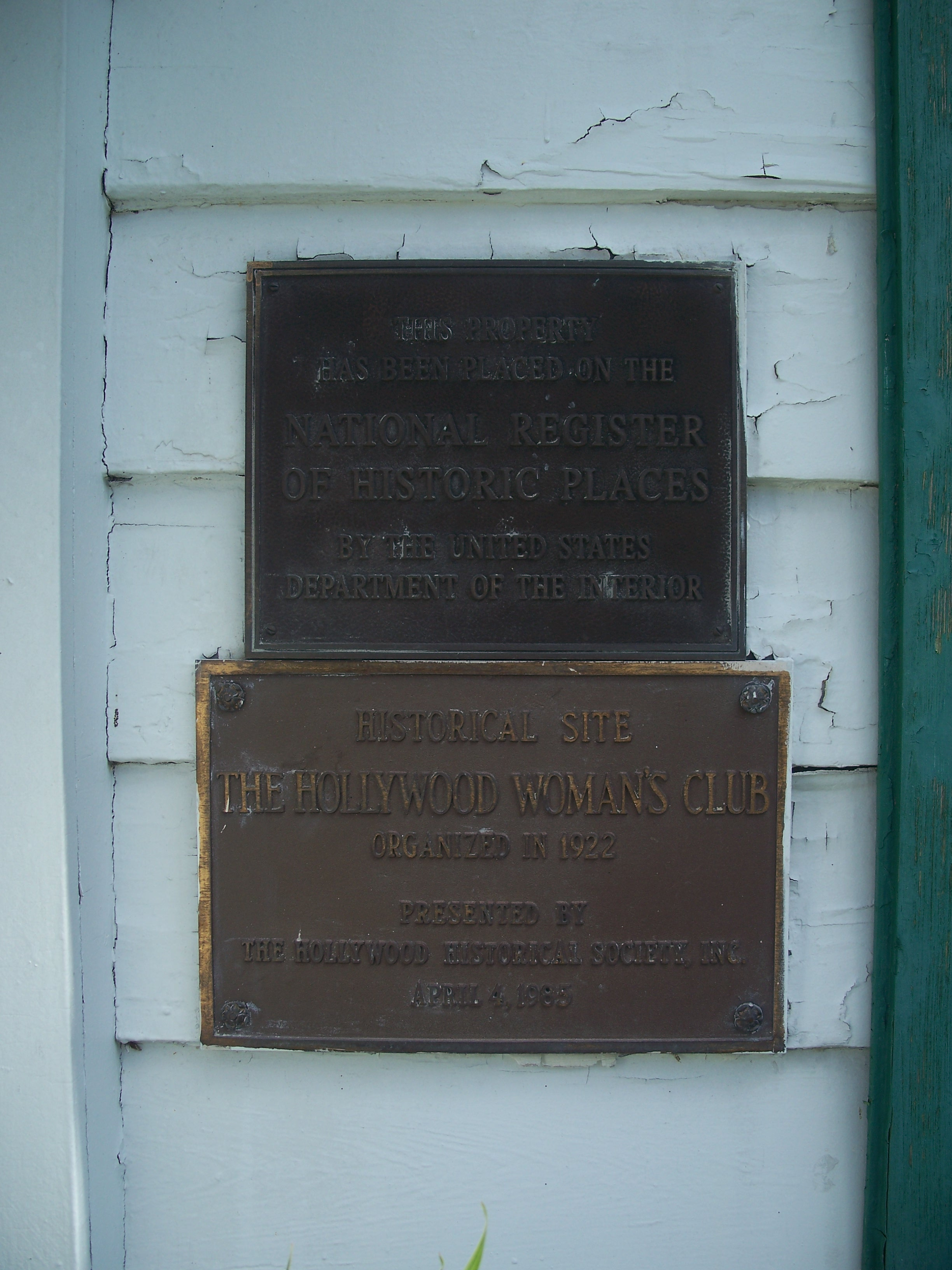
- Historical markers
- Built: 1927
- Architect: C. E. Payne
- Architectural style: Vernacular, Neoclassical
- MPS: Clubhouses of Florida's Woman's Clubs Multiple Property Submission
- NRHP reference No.: 95000055
- Added to NRHP: February 10, 1995

The Hollywood Woman's Club is a historic woman's club at 501 North 14th Avenue in Hollywood, Florida. On February 10, 1995, it was added to the U.S. National Register of Historic Places.

== Building ==
The club is a one-story, wood-frame vernacular meeting hall with a front gabled roof. It was erected in 1927. The 53-by-31-foot (16.2 by 9.4 m) rectangular building sits on a raised concrete block foundation. The roof is supported by wooden trusses and covered by asphalt shingles.

=== Exterior ===
The main entrance on the west side of the building faces North 14th Avenue. The building is fronted by a concrete porch with three steps leading to louvered double doors surrounded by windows. Panels of five lights each flank the doors, and above it a seven panel fanlight frames a sign with the club's name. Gabled returns supported by pilasters and a pair of Tuscan columns show a neoclassical architectural influence. Two four-light windows with green shutters are centered on either side of the door. Each of the windows has green two-panel shutters with cutouts of a full moon on top and a crescent moon on the bottom. The north and south side have four windows each, and the back of the building has three. The building is painted white and sheathed in clapboard except the four bottom courses covered with asbestos shingles. The porches and roof are green.

=== Interior ===
The front doors lead directly into the main assembly room. This room is 40 feet (12 m) deep and 30 feet (9.1 m) wide. There are white plaster walls and wooden door surrounds with a podium area on the east side distinguished by a framed 48-inch-tall (120 cm) panel of seven 12-inch-wide (30 cm) boards. The back 11 feet (3.4 m) of the building is equally divided into a kitchen and a dressing and storage room.

=== Alterations ===
The doors were originally ten-light French doors. There was lattice work on either side of the columns in front that has been removed. The double-hung multiple-light windows have been replaced with aluminum frame awning windows. A section of the east wall has been rebuilt without noticeably modifying the appearance. A back window was replaced by a door with a small porch. The kitchen was remodeled in 1944 with the installation of an electric refrigerator and gas stove. A suspended ceiling conceals the retained original wood tongue-and-groove ceiling. The main room has been carpeted, the bathrooms tiled, and a dishwasher installed in the kitchen. Walls and ceilings have been refurbished.

== Setting ==
The land under the club and the surrounding Hollywood Lakes neighborhood was built up using the dredging from the two man-made lakes created as part of the development. The club's landscaping includes hedges, palms, shrubs, and open lawn. The building was originally planned to fit in with the architecture of local homes, but due to financial issues, a simple wooden building was constructed with a neoclassical facade. The double lot was donated to the Hollywood Woman's Club by Joseph W. Young, the founder of Hollywood, specifically for a club house. The woman's club was organized in 1922 at the time when the city was just coming to be. The woman's club meshed closely with the vision of the town founders, and it played an important role in the development of the City of Hollywood.

== See also ==
- National Register of Historic Places listings in Broward County, Florida
