= Terra Ceia Village Improvement Association Hall =

- U.S. National Register of Historic Places
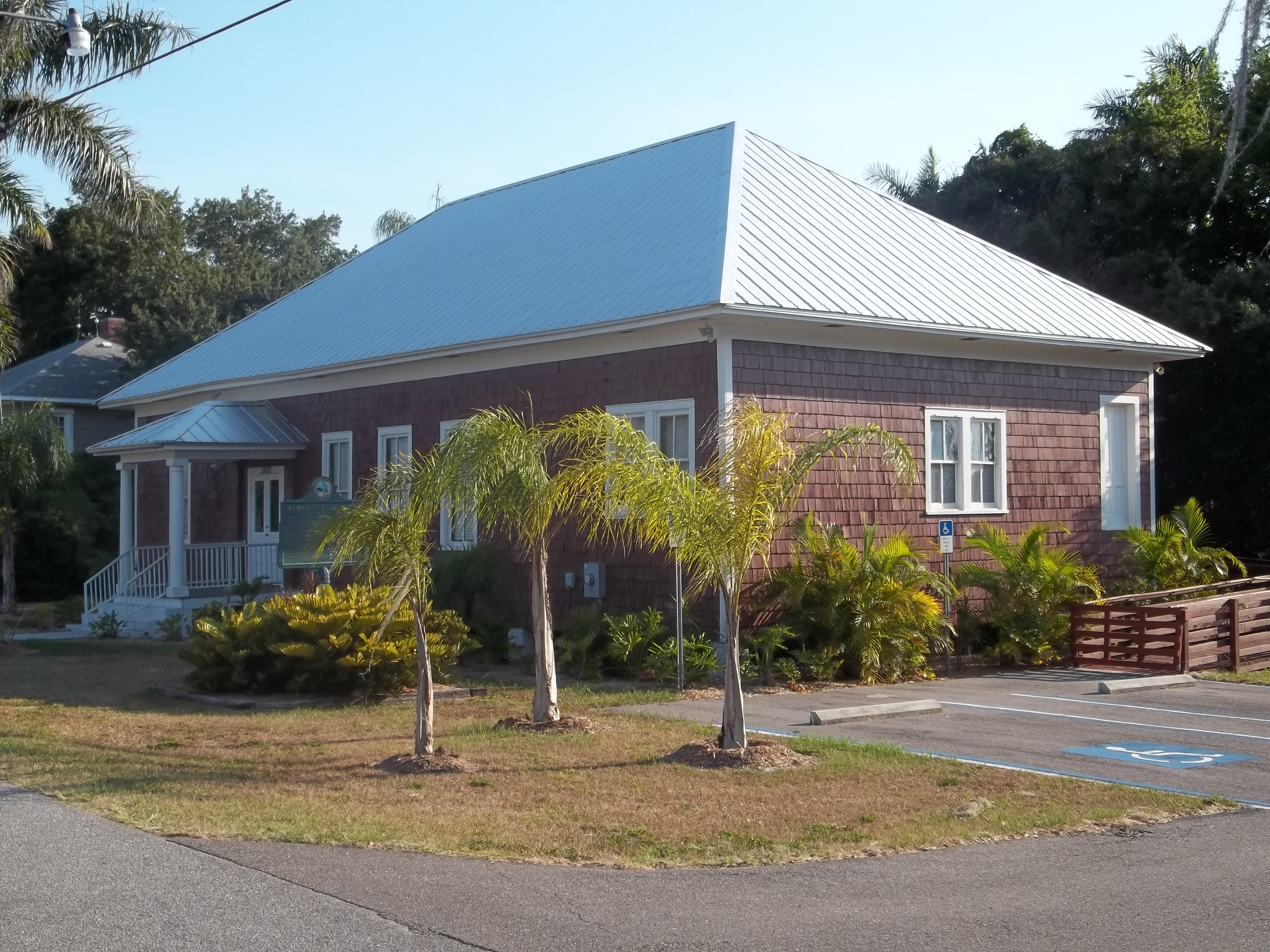

- Location within Florida Location within the United States
- Location: 1505 Center Road, Terra Ceia, Florida
- Coordinates: 27°34′22″N 82°34′54″W
- Built: 1906
- Architect: Joseph E. Weatherall
- MPS: Clubhouses of Florida's Woman's Clubs MPS
- NRHP reference No.: 03000942
- Added to NRHP: September 16, 2003

The Terra Ceia Village Improvement Association Hall is a historic women's clubhouse in Terra Ceia, Florida, United States. Built in 1906, it is one of the oldest women's clubhouses in Florida. Also known as the Terra Ceia Woman's Club, it was added to the National Register of Historic Places on September 16, 2003, as part of the Clubhouses of Florida's Woman's Clubs Multiple Property Submission (MPS). It was listed for being an important local venue for a wide variety of community events since its construction.

== See also ==
- List of Registered Historic Woman's Clubhouses in Florida
