= Anderson–Price Memorial Library Building =

- U.S. National Register of Historic Places
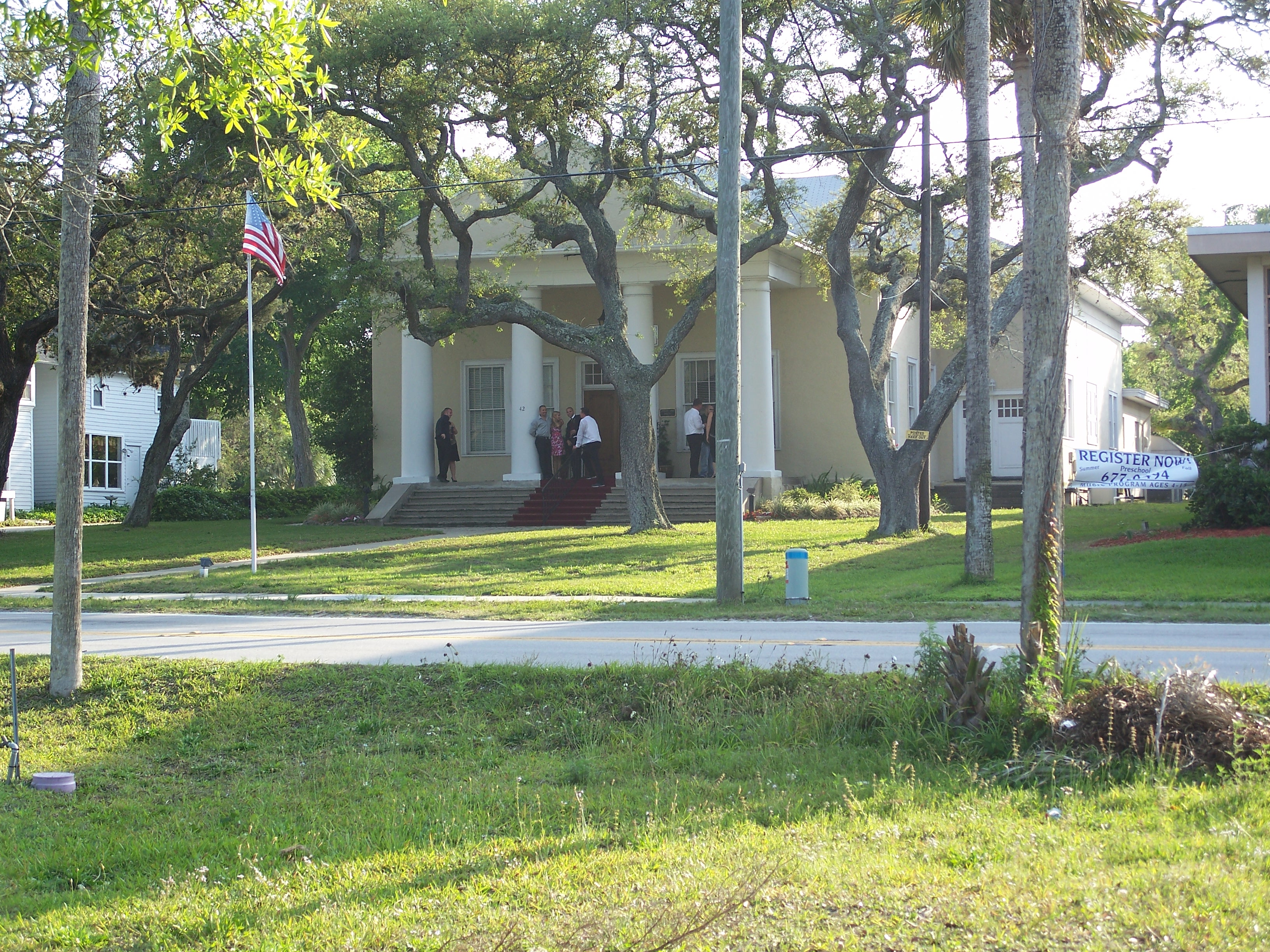

- Location within Volusia County
- Location: Ormond Beach, Florida
- Coordinates: 29°17′26″N 81°2′50″W
- Built: 1915
- NRHP reference No.: 84000967
- Added to NRHP: January 26, 1984

The Anderson–Price Memorial Library Building (also known as the Ormond Beach Woman's Club) is a historic library in Ormond Beach, Florida, United States. It is located at 42 North Beach Street, and was named for the City of Ormond Beach's co-founders John Anderson and Joseph D. Price. It was added to the National Register of Historic Places in 1984 and is an example of 20th century architecture.

Now run by the Ormond Beach Historical Trust, this building is the site of many events throughout the year.

== History ==
In 1894, the Village Improvement Association (VIA) purchased this site of this building, which was originally a storefront building with an attached residence. The VIA was originally started January 9, 1891 as an all women's club made up of a group of residents in Ormond Beach dedicated to promoting "neatness and order in the village," and improving the community through various civic engagement activities. After purchasing the property, which would be used for the groups meetings, the collection of the Ormond Library at the time was moved from the original Lincoln Avenue address to the storefront part of the building. The librarian at the time was Mrs. Pinkerton, widow of Ormond Beach's first minister. During her time as librarian, Mrs. Pinkerton lived in the residential part of the building.

Starting in 1912, the VIA began the process of getting a new building constructed to act as the town's library and meeting place, replacing the store building and residence. George Carlton was hired on as the construction project's superintendent in July of 1915. Construction for the new building, the Anderson-Price Memorial Building, finished around 1916. The name of the building comes from Joseph D. Price and John Anderson, prominent members of the community who were business partners until Anderson's death in 1910.

This location was used as the town's library until 1969, when the collection was moved to a location near City Hall which is the present location of the Ormond Beach Regional Library, part of the Volusia County Public Library system.

== See also ==
- List of Registered Historic Woman's Clubhouses in Florida
