= National Register of Historic Places listings in Henry County, Illinois =

Location of Henry County in Illinois

This is a list of the National Register of Historic Places listings in Henry County, Illinois.

This is intended to be a complete list of the properties and districts on the National Register of Historic Places in Henry County, Illinois, United States. Latitude and longitude coordinates are provided for many National Register properties and districts; these locations may be seen together in a map.

There are 16 properties and districts listed on the National Register in the county, including 1 National Historic Landmark.

This National Park Service list is complete through NPS recent listings posted May 23, 2025.

== Current listings ==
	Name on the Register	Image	Date listed	Location	City or town	Description
1	Andover Chapter House	Andover Chapter House	November 28, 1980 (#80001367)	Locust St., NW. 41°17′39″N 90°17′32″W	Andover	
2	Annawan Chapter House	Annawan Chapter House	November 28, 1980 (#80001368)	206 S. Depot St. 41°23′52″N 89°57′30″W	Annawan	
3	Atkinson Hall	Atkinson Hall	November 28, 2003 (#03001203)	108 W. Main St. 41°26′51″N 90°09′23″W	Geneseo	
4	Bishop Hill Historic District	Bishop Hill Historic District	April 17, 1970 (#70000244)	Off U.S. Route 34; 41°12′07″N 90°07′06″W	Bishop Hill	
5	Frederick Francis Woodland Palace	Frederick Francis Woodland Palace	April 14, 1975 (#75000662)	2.5 miles northeast of Kewanee on U.S. Route 34; 41°16′44″N 89°51′35″W	Kewanee	
6	Galva Opera House	Galva Opera House	February 11, 1982 (#82002538)	334-348 Front St. 41°09′57″N 90°02′32″W	Galva	
7	Henry County Courthouse	Henry County Courthouse	August 20, 2004 (#04000869)	307 W. Center St. 41°18′15″N 90°11′48″W	Cambridge	
8	Olof Johnson House	Olof Johnson House	February 11, 1982 (#82002539)	408 NW. 4th St. 41°10′12″N 90°02′52″W	Galva	
9	Kewanee Hotel	Kewanee Hotel	February 1, 2006 (#05001605)	125 N. Chestnut; 41°14′44″N 89°55′42″W	Kewanee	
10	Kewanee Public Library	Kewanee Public Library	May 31, 2006 (#06000447)	102 S. Tremont; 41°14′43″N 89°55′34″W	Kewanee	
11	Jenny Lind Chapel	Jenny Lind Chapel	April 1, 1975 (#75000661)	Southwestern corner of the junction of 6th and Oak Sts. 41°17′29″N 90°17′56″W	Andover	
12	Music Pavilion	Music Pavilion	May 22, 2002 (#02000544)	1208 5th St. 41°21′13″N 90°22′51″W	Orion	
13	August and Margaretha Rehnstrom House		December 10, 2008 (#08001170)	418 Locust St. 41°17′43″N 90°17′33″W	Andover	
14	Ryan Round Barn	Ryan Round Barn	December 31, 1974 (#74000762)	6 miles north of Kewanee; 41°19′26″N 89°53′42″W	Kewanee	
15	South Side School	South Side School	May 6, 1975 (#75002142)	209 S. College Ave. 41°27′04″N 90°09′33″W	Geneseo	
16	West Water Tower and Ground Storage Tank	West Water Tower and Ground Storage Tank	February 5, 2003 (#02001754)	310 11th Ave. 41°21′12″N 90°22′55″W	Orion	

== See also ==
- List of National Historic Landmarks in Illinois
- National Register of Historic Places listings in Illinois
