= Helfensteller, Hirsch & Watson =

- Company type: Private
- Industry: Architecture
- Predecessor: Hirsch & Helfensteller
- Founded: 1907
- Founder: Ernest Helfensteller; William Albert Hirsch; Jesse N. Watson
- Fate: 1940
- Headquarters: St. Louis, Missouri, United States
- Area served: United States
- Key people: Ernest Helfensteller; William Albert Hirsch; Jesse N. Watson
- Services: Architecture

Helfensteller, Hirsch & Watson was an early twentieth-century American architectural firm from St. Louis, Missouri. It succeeded Hirsch and Helfensteller which had been founded in 1903. The firm's partners included Ernest Helfensteller, William Albert Hirsch and Jesse N. Watson. The firm quickly gained prominence with its 1912 design of the Moolah Temple in St. Louis.

== History ==
Helfensteller, Hirsch & Watson was founded in 1907 by Ernest Helfensteller, William Albert Hirsch and Jesse N. Watson. The firm operated until 1940. The firm had been preceded by the architectural firm of Hirsch and Helfensteller which operated from 1903 to 1907. With the addition of principal architect Jesse N. Watson to the firm it became Helfensteller, Hirsch & Watson.

== The Moolah Temple ==
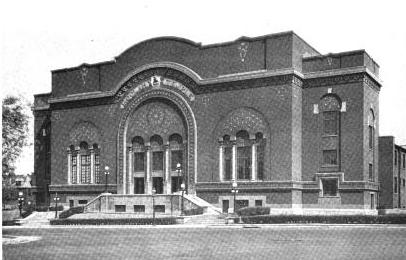
Moolah Temple

The Moolah Temple of St. Louis, designed in 1912 by Helfensteller of Helfensteller, Hirsch and Watson, has been described as an "architectural gem". Helfensteller gave the building "a Moorish feel with a brick facade, winding staircases, vaulted ceilings and ornate, boldly colored tile. The whole thing costed $250,000."

The building was vacant for 20 years. The Medinah Temple portion of the building was renovated by 2008 at a cost of $7 million USD. The Moolah Temple is a contributing building in St. Louis's Midtown Historic District, and was listed on the U.S. National Register of Historic Places (NRHP). The district's NRHP nomination describes the building's architecture as "colorful": "Near Eastern/Arabic forms and symbols parade and dance across the front elevation. The center bay makes the statement for the structure.... Gold terra cotta outlines the foundation and covers arches, cornice, moldings and columns; door and window frames are painted bright blue; decorative terra cotta in blue, green and gold emphasize round arch forms and articulate corners and peaks."

== Peer reviews ==
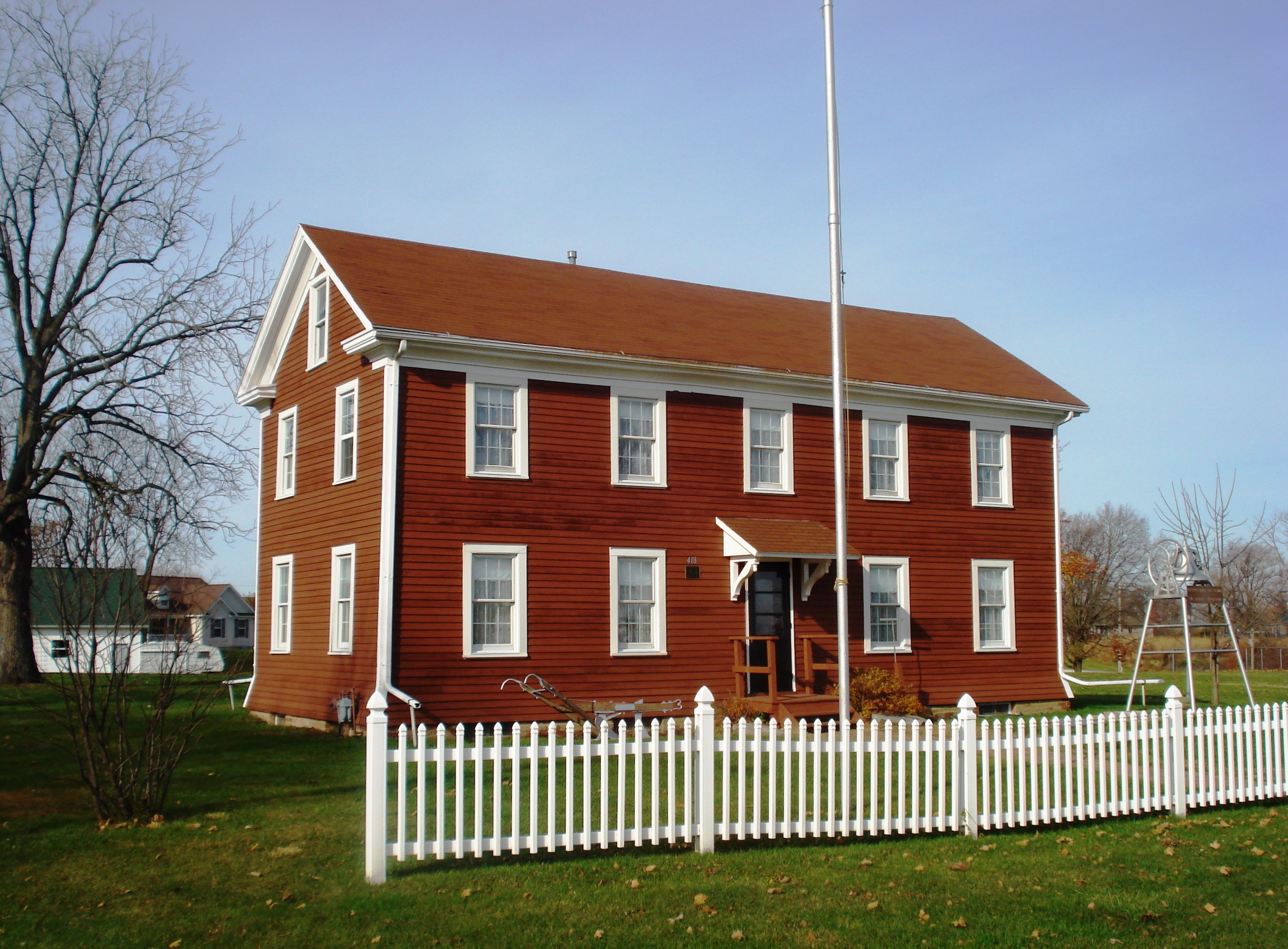
Andover Chapter House, in 2011

Photos of two of the firms' works, the Moolah Temple and the New Grand Central Theatre, were selected for inclusion in a June 1916 issue of the Western Architect which covered architecture of St. Louis.

Principal works of Hirsch reported in a 1962 American Institute of Architects (AIA) directory include the Liederkranz Club, the Moolah Temple, the Missouri Theatre Office Building, the Louis Latzer Memorial Library and others, all in or near St. Louis. Hirsch served as president of the St. Louis chapter of the AIA during 1923-24.

== Other works ==
The architectural firm designed for a variety of clients. For client Edward Gardner Lewis, publisher of Woman's Magazine, once the largest circulation magazine in the nation, the firm designed standard plans for women's club buildings. A number of their works, including 12 women's club buildings, are listed on the U.S. National Register of Historic Places.

Notable works by the firm or its partners include (attribution):

- Alton Chapter House (built 1909), 509 Beacon St. Alton, IL (Helfensteller, Hirsch and Watson), NRHP-listed
- American Women's League Chapter House (Peck, Idaho), 217 N. Main St. Peck, ID (Helfensteller, Hirsch & Watson), NRHP-listed
- Andover Chapter House, Locust St., NW Andover, IL (Helfensteller, Hirsch and Watson), NRHP-listed
- Annawan Chapter House, 206 S. Depot St. Annawan, IL (Helfensteller, Hirsch and Watson), NRHP-listed
- Carlinville Chapter House, 111 S. Charles St. Carlinville, IL (Helfensteller, Hirsch and Watson), NRHP-listed
- Carmi Chapter House, 604 W. Main St., Carmi, IL, NRHP-listed
- City Hall, 6618 Delmar Boulevard, University City, Missouri
- Deer Lodge American Women's League Chapter House, 802 Missouri Ave. Deer Lodge, MT (Helfensteller, Hirch & Watson), NRHP-listed
- Edwardsville Chapter House, 515 W. High St. Edwardsville, IL (Helfensteller, Hirsch and Watson), NRHP-listed
- Liederkranz Club, St. Louis, MO
- Louis Latzer Memorial Library, Highland, IL
- Marine Chapter House, Silver St. Marine, IL (Helfensteller, Hirsch and Watson), NRHP-listed
- Maywood Woman's Club, 902 Marin St. Corning, CA (Helfensteller, Hirsch & Watson), NRHP-listed
- Missouri Theatre Office Building, St. Louis
- Moolah Temple, St. Louis, Missouri (Ernest Helfensteller; Helfensteller, Hirsch & Watson)
- New Grand Central Theatre, St. Louis, Missouri
- Princeton Chapter House, 1007 N. Main St. Princeton, IL (Helfensteller, Hirsh & Watson), NRHP-listed
- Woman's Club House, 900 Poyntz Ave. Manhattan, KS (Helfensteller, Hirsch & Watson), NRHP-listed
- Zion Chapter House, 2715 Emmaus Ave. Zion, IL (Helfensteller, Hirsch and Watson), NRHP-listed

== Firm's characterization ==
Helfensteller has been informally characterized as being "no big shot like that Tadao Ando fella who built ... the Pulitzer Foundation, [neighboring building to the Moolah Temple designed by Helfensteller]. Still, he had style."
