= Carmi Chapter House =

- U.S. National Register of Historic Places
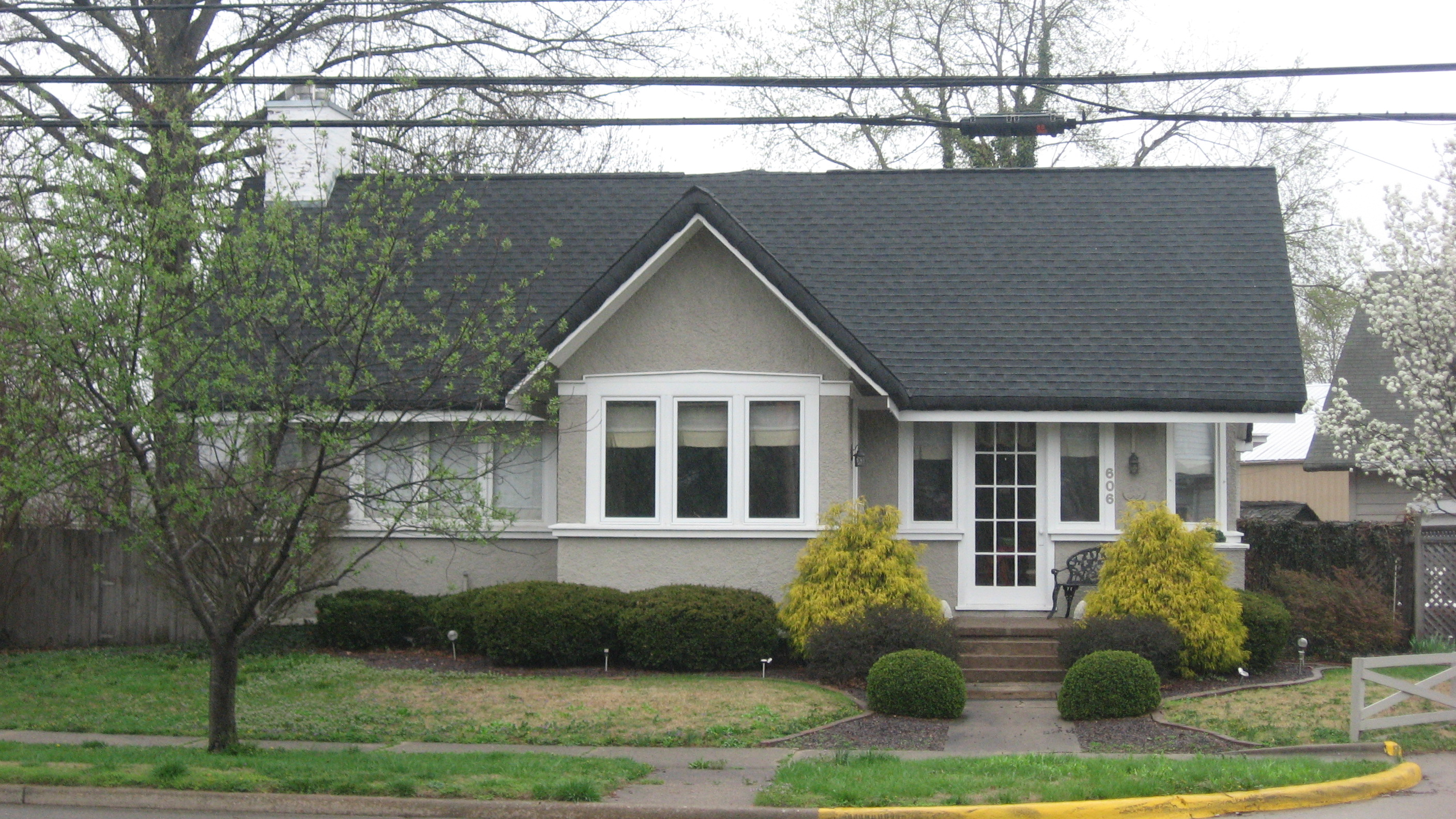

- Location within Illinois Location within the United States
- Location: 604 W. Main St., Carmi, Illinois
- Coordinates: 38°5′7″N 88°10′5″W
- Area: 1.1 acres (0.45 ha)
- Architect: Helfensteller, Hirsch and Watson
- Architectural style: Prairie School
- MPS: American Woman's League Chapter Houses TR
- NRHP reference No.: 80001416
- Added to NRHP: November 28, 1980

The Carmi Chapter House is a historic building located at 604 W. Main St. in Carmi, Illinois. The building was constructed between 1909 and 1910 as a meetinghouse for Carmi's chapter of the American Woman's League. The American Woman's League was a political and social organization founded by magazine publisher Edward Gardner Lewis in 1908. The organization was created to promote feminist causes, particularly the women's suffrage movement; Lewis also intended for the organization to promote and sell his women's magazines. Lewis commissioned the St. Louis architectural firm of Helfensteller, Hirsch & Watson to design five classes of buildings which the League would use as meetinghouses. The Carmi Chapter House is an example of a Class II building, which was designed for clubs with 60 to 100 members. The building was designed in the Prairie School style and cost $2,500. After the club disbanded, it was converted to a private home.

The building was added to the National Register of Historic Places on November 28, 1980. It is one of nine American Woman's League chapter houses on the National Register in Illinois.
