= Katy Hamman-Stricker Library =

Historic place in Calvert, Robertson County, Texas

Coordinates: 30°58.801′N 96°40.451′W

Sculpture above the fireplace created by Romanian sculptor George Julian Zolnay.

The Katy Hamman-Stricker Library is located at 404 E. Mitchell Street in Calvert, Texas, USA. It consists of a museum as well as a public library and community center and was the first chapter house built by the American Woman's League in the state. Calvert is located within the Golden Triangle (the area between the cities of Dallas, Houston and Austin) of Texas. The building was constructed in 1909 but its role changed thirty years later when it became the town library. It is designated as a Recorded Texas Historic Landmark.

== History ==
The building housing the library and museum was built by the American Woman's League (AWL) in 1909. It was the first AWL Chapter House in Texas, and one of the first four in the country.

The American Woman's League (AWL) was created in 1907 by the magazine publisher E.G. Lewis, as a way to spread women's suffrage as well as gain new salespersons for his magazine business. The aim of the AWL was to promote educational, cultural and business opportunities for women. He planned a network of institutions and businesses to serve women that included correspondence schools, postal libraries, savings banks and institutions to provide for the homeless and for orphans. He provided funding to have chapter houses built in small towns across the United States, each intended to provide a community center for cultural, educational and social events and create employment opportunities for women. Fifty percent of the profit from magazine subscriptions was funnelled back into the AWL.

Katy Hamman-Stricker led a movement to erect a League of Woman's meeting house in Calvert, Texas. She was the daughter of Confederate General William H. Hamman who turned his attention after the American Civil War to land and railroad speculation. He stood as a candidate in the race for governor of Texas in 1878 and 1880 under the Greenback Party banner, but lost on both occasions. Both Stricker and her husband, jeweler Herman L. Stricker, were business, civic and social leaders. They built a two-storey Victorian home at 503 Pin Oak, Calvert in 1900 which became a Recorded Texas Historic Landmark in 1973.

== Architecture ==
At first, the one room building with its small kitchen area served as the league's clubhouse. The building's architectural style was in the tradition of the Prairie School, with a low gabled roof. By 1939, the AWL had been discontinued and the Calvert Woman's Club purchased the building for use as a library. Today, the Calvert Woman's Club continues to sponsor the library for the community.

The library is named for Katy Hamman-Stricker, a charter member of the local AWL, who continued to be a long-term supporter and patron of the library.

The Texas Historical Commission (THC) designated it a Recorded Texas Historic Landmark in 2003.

== Recent events ==
Calvert's is one of 38 AWL chapter houses in the country and the only one remaining in the state of Texas. In 2005, the historic building was in need of renovation as it was suffering from subsidence and needed roofing work and rewiring. As part of its "We the People" initiative, the National Endowment for the Humanities awarded the custodians a $14,656 federal grant to carry out repairs.
