= Woman's Club House =

Woman's Club House (or Clubhouse) may also refer to:

- Lyons Woman's Club House, a historic building in Lyons, Georgia, U.S.
- Dawson Woman's Clubhouse, a historic log cabin in Dawson, Georgia, U.S.
- Woman's Club House (Manhattan, Kansas), a historic building

== See also ==
- Woman's Club (disambiguation)
- List of women's clubs
