= Else Hirsch =

German-Jewish teacher, organized children's transports out of Nazi Germany

Else Hirsch

Else Hirsch (29 July 1889 – 1942 or 1943) was a Jewish teacher in Bochum, Germany, and a member of the German Resistance against Nazi Germany. She organized transports of Jewish children to the Netherlands and England, saving them from Nazi deportation to concentration camps and death. Hirsch perished in the Riga Ghetto, at the age of 53 or 54.

== Biography ==
Born in Bützow, in the Grand Duchy of Mecklenburg-Schwerin, Hirsch came from Berlin to Bochum at the end of 1926 and lived with her mother. She had taken an exam to qualify as a teacher of older children, but was unemployed and was assigned (and required) to teach at the Jewish school. She was initially less than pleased with this but soon threw herself into her work. In her free time, Hirsch worked at the Bochum Jewish Women's Club and gave Hebrew lessons to girls until these activities were stopped by the Nazis in autumn 1933.

In October 1937, she took a course in English at the Reichsvertretung der Deutschen Juden in Berlin to be able to give English lessons to those who might be able to emigrate. She travelled to Palestine in June 1938.

On 11 November 1938, Reichskristallnacht, the Bochum synagogue was burned down. The Jewish school was also destroyed by the SA. Afterward, all of the official representatives of the Jewish community were deported. Hirsch fought to have the school reopened, but it stayed open only for a short while. Hirsch began to organize transports for children and adolescents in arrangement with the Jewish Reichsvertretung. Between December 1938 and August 1939, she organized ten children's transports to the Netherlands and England. Hirsch took care of all the travel preparations, filling out lengthy forms, registering the children, gathering required documents, sending papers to London, securing exit visas, reserving seating on the trains, buying the tickets and staying in close touch with the parents.

She stayed with the remaining pupils as the only Jewish teacher until the school was closed in September 1941. Emigration for Jews was prohibited after 1941. In late January 1942, Hirsch and some of her pupils were deported to the Riga Ghetto. A surviving pupil reports that for a short while she continued to teach children. She also organized meals for weakened people and the elderly. The last time when the surviving student saw her, she was collecting nettles and dandelion leaves to cook as vegetables for the seniors. She was killed in 1942 or 1943.

== Quote ==
Hirsch wrote in the poetry album of a pupil, "Judge not the worth of men / after just one peep / Up above are but ripples / to probe, one must dig deep."

== Legacy ==
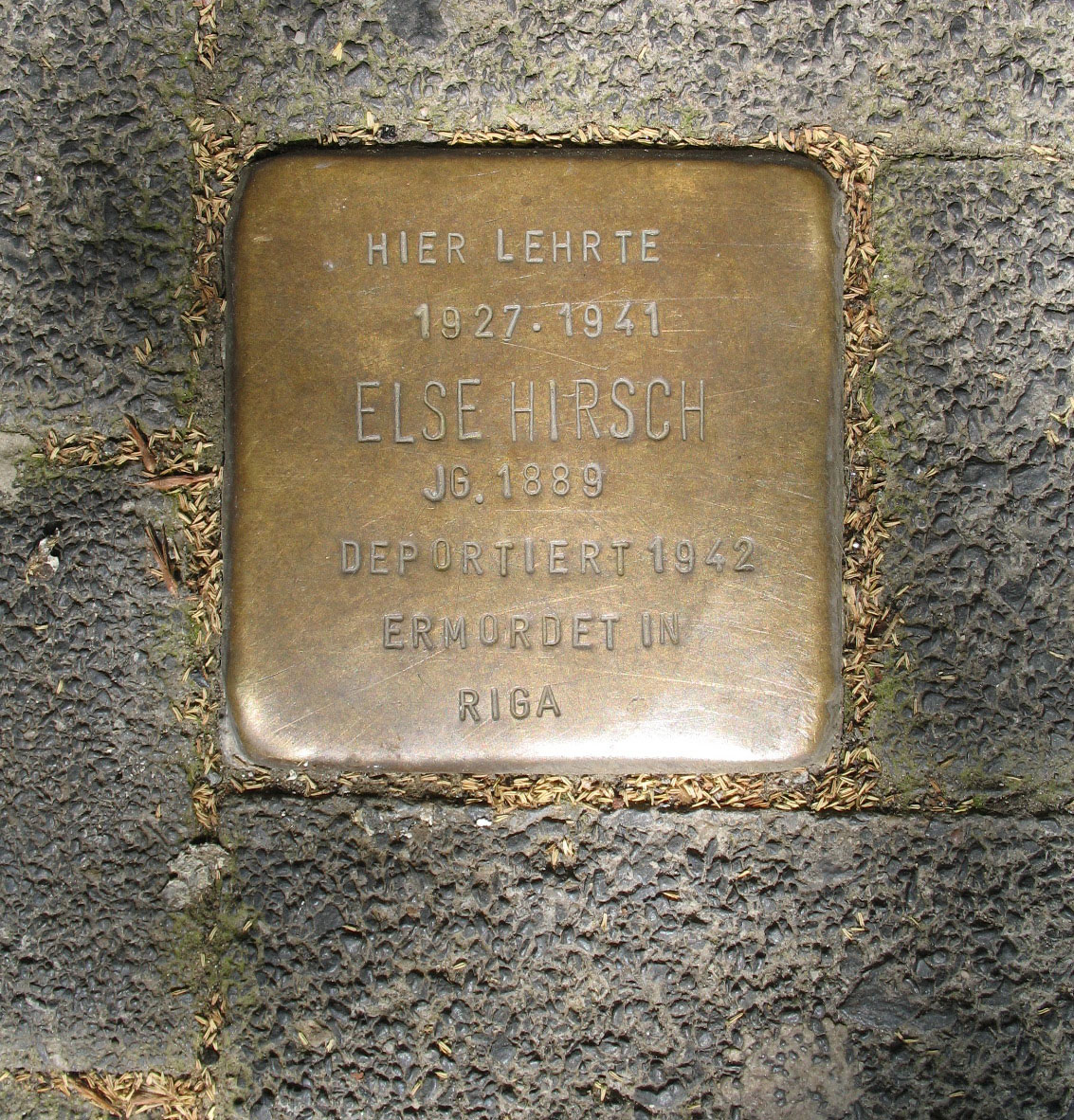
Stolperstein for Hirsch on sidewalk in downtown Bochum, Germany

Streets in Bochum and Bad Lausick are named after her. There is a stolperstein for Hirsch at Huestraße 28 in Bochum, Germany, where she taught from 1927 to 1941.

== See also ==
- Anna Essinger
- Bunce Court School
- List of Germans who resisted Nazism
