= Princeton Chapter House =

- U.S. National Register of Historic Places
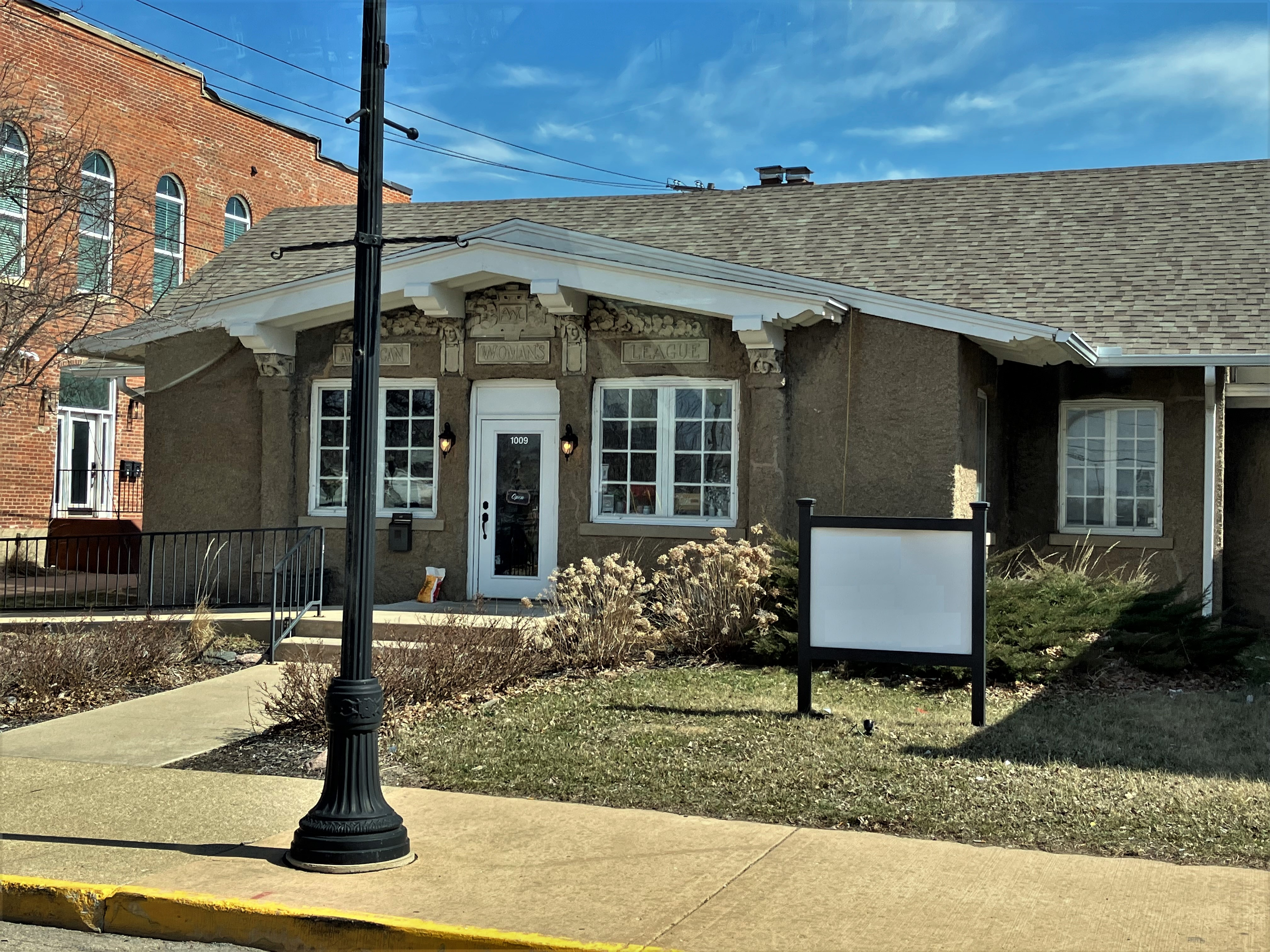

- Location within Illinois Location within the United States
- Location: 1009 N. Main St., Princeton, Illinois
- Coordinates: 41°23′5″N 89°27′53″W
- Area: 0.2 acres (0.081 ha)
- Architect: Helfensteller, Hirsch & Watson
- Architectural style: Mission Revival
- MPS: American Woman's League Chapter Houses TR
- NRHP reference No.: 80001338
- Added to NRHP: November 28, 1980

The Princeton Chapter House is a historic building located at 1009 N. Main St. in Princeton, Illinois. The building was constructed between 1909 and 1910 as a meetinghouse for Princeton's chapter of the American Woman's League. The American Woman's League was a political and social organization founded by magazine publisher Edward Gardner Lewis in 1908. The organization was created to promote feminist causes, particularly the women's suffrage movement; Lewis also intended for the organization to promote and sell his women's magazines. Lewis commissioned the St. Louis architectural firm of Helfensteller, Hirsch & Watson to design five classes of buildings which the League would use as meetinghouses. The Princeton Chapter House is the only Class IV chapter house ever built; the Class IV plan was one of the larger buildings and was designed for clubs with 140 to 200 members. The building was designed in the Mission Revival style and cost $5,000. After the club disbanded, it served as a public library before being converted to a business.

The building was added to the National Register of Historic Places on November 28, 1980. It is one of nine American Woman's League chapter houses on the National Register in Illinois.
