= American Women's League Chapter House (Peck, Idaho) =

- U.S. National Register of Historic Places
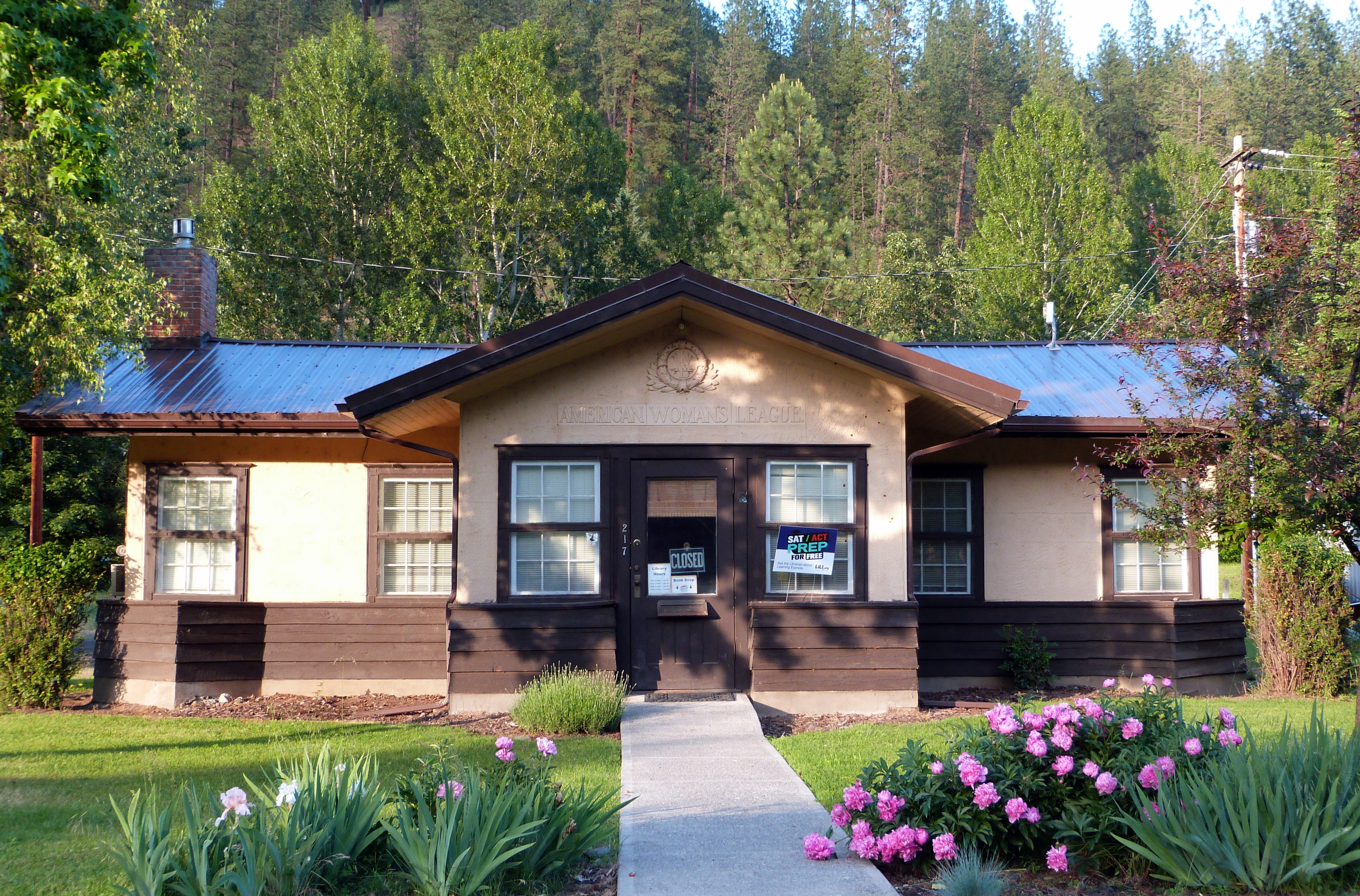
- The chapter house in 2015

- Location within Idaho Location within the United States
- Location: 217 N. Main St., Peck, Idaho
- Coordinates: 46°28′30″N 116°25′20″W
- Area: less than one acre
- Built: 1909
- Architect: Helfensteller, Hirsch & Watson
- Architectural style: Prairie School
- NRHP reference No.: 86002158
- Added to NRHP: September 4, 1986

The American Women's League Chapter House in Peck, Idaho was built in 1909. It was designed with Prairie School style elements by St. Louis architects Helfensteller, Hirsch & Watson. It was deemed historically significant as "a nearly unaltered example of AWL architecture", being the only one of Idaho's two American Women's League chapter houses that survives, and "for its association with the AWL movement and for its role as a center for local social and educational activities."

At the time of this chapter house's nomination in 1986, it was not known by the nominator what the status was for the 39 other AWL chapter houses once existing in the United States, hence the national-level importance of this example was unknown.

It was listed on the National Register of Historic Places in 1986.
