= American Woman's League =

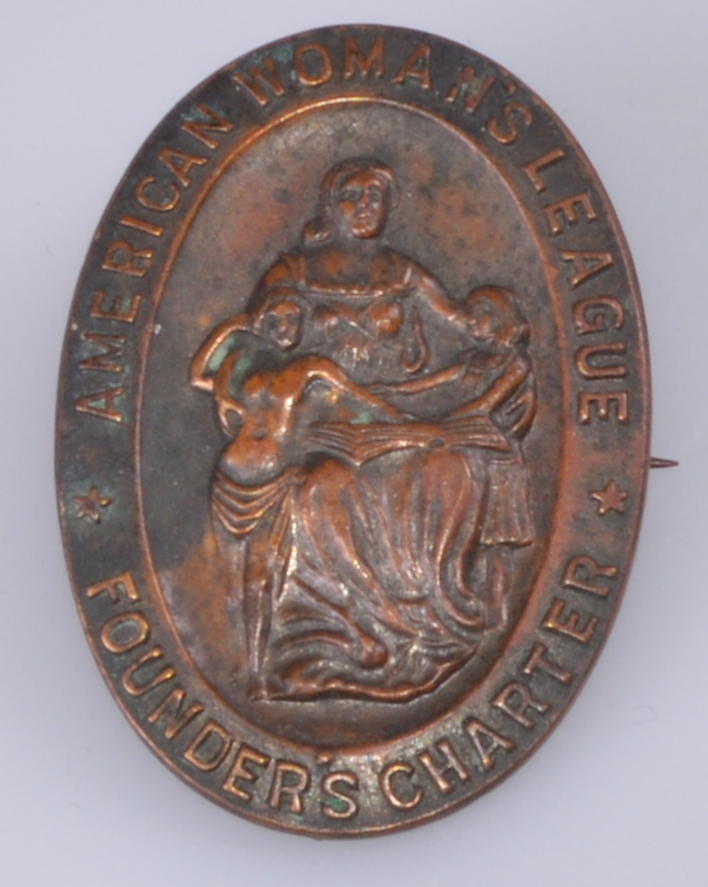
American Woman's League Founder's Chapter Pin

The American Woman's League (succeeded by American Woman's Republic) was created by the magazine publisher Edward Gardner Lewis in 1907. In part, it was a maneuver to lower postal rates by appealing to educational and social opportunities that would appeal to the emerging women's suffrage movement. His magazines, Woman's Magazine and the Woman's Farm Journal, had been denied second class postal rates because they were judged as advertisements and thus did not qualify for a lower rate as second class mail. Rather than magazine sales representatives making commissions, as was the common practice at the time, the payments went to form local women's "Chapter Houses".

Although the local groups began as a marketing venture, many become prominent women's clubs within their communities. The network later became a more traditional organization with dues paid to the national office and renamed the "American Woman's Republic".

The 1986 nomination of an Idaho 1909-built AWL chapter house to the National Register of Historic Places (NRHP) states that there were 39 other AWL chapter houses once existing in the United States (beyond two in Idaho).

== Chapter houses ==
- Andover Chapter House, Andover, Illinois, NRHP-listed
- American Women's League Chapter House (Peck, Idaho), Peck, Idaho, NRHP-listed
- Alton Chapter House
- Annawan Chapter House
- Carlinville Chapter House
- Carmi Chapter House
- Deer Lodge American Women's League Chapter House
- Edwardsville Chapter House
- Katy Hamman-Stricker Library
- Maywood Woman's Club
- Princeton Chapter House
- Zion Chapter House
