= Marie Moentmann =

American accident victim

- Moentmann in 1915
- Born: September 6, 1900; St. Louis, Missouri
- Died: July 15, 1974 (aged 73); St. Louis, Missouri

Marie Moentmann (September 6, 1900 – July 15, 1974) was a 15-year-old girl who lost her hands and full use of both arms in a factory accident in 1915 in St. Louis, Missouri.

She became a center of public attention in what the St. Louis Post-Dispatch called an "extraordinary case." Charity events were held on her behalf while she recovered, and gifts from the public flooded her hospital room. The company where she had been employed as an under-age worker quickly settled her suit for damages.

She was fitted with artificial hands, which she learned to use with proficiency. She had trouble finding employment but was eventually set up in business by a friend.

== The accident ==
Marie Moentmann was severely injured on November 5, 1915, when she was working on a rotary stamp press or a printing press at the Fulton Bag and Cotton Mills, 610–612 South Seventh Street, St. Louis. She had begun working there at the age of 14. The first news stories about the accident gave Marie's age as seventeen.

She was pushing burlap bags into a cylinder roll with a stick. One bag went into the roll crooked, and Marie tried to straighten it out with her right hand. Her fingers were caught; she grasped her wrist with her right hand, but her fingers were caught, the roll continued to turn, and both hands were "terribly mangled." The cylinders were studded with small spikes to hold the bags. The St. Louis Star reported:

Nettie McManus, ... who stood at the next machine, screamed when she saw her companion's plight. Edward Wright, foreman, ... turned off the power, and released the rolls and extricated the girl's hands. She retained consciousness, although every one of the thirty girls who were working in the second floor factory room with her became hysterical, [and] several fainted.

Marie was able to walk into an elevator and entered an ambulance before losing consciousness.

Police officer Frederick Proehl escorted the girl to the hospital, and on the way she refused to look at her mangled, bandaged hands in her lap, stating, "Do not talk about the accident. Do not talk about my hands."

Proehl said Marie had been working at the factory for a year, "and because of her sweet, sunny disposition and blonde prettiness [she] is a great favorite." She earned $5.80 or $5.90 per week.

At the hospital, her right arm was amputated below her shoulder and her left arm at the wrist. At first, she was not told of the extent of the operation, doctors believing the shock of knowledge might kill her; she believed only that the tip of a finger was severed. No one visiting her was permitted to speak of the extent of her injuries.

On December 17 another operation was performed under local anesthetic, which Marie was able to watch. She made good progress until January 3, 1916, when she fell ill with pneumonia. It was a "long siege," but she was sent home later in the month.

On March 3 the next year, Dr. Robert Wilson cut a small section of bone from her right arm, at no charge, so she could be fitted with a prosthetic arm. Mrs. C.A. Lange contributed $50 for the device, with the balance to come from Marie's funds.

== Public reaction ==
Efforts to assist Marie and her family began quickly. One of the first was an invitation to a play at the Shenandoah Theater, "Little Lord Fauntleroy," which she attended via ambulance on November 25 with her sister, Mrs. Theresa Wilenauer.

A "bridge and 500" party was given at the Planters Hotel for her benefit. More than a thousand tickets were sold at $1 each. Loretta Wand was the chief organizer. From $1,200 to $1,400 was raised from more than eight hundred "society women" who attended. The money was to be paid to the girl at $10 a week, and a hundred women said they would each contribute fifty cents a week. Later in the month, the organizers gave her a bank book with the sum of $1,085.72.

On Christmas Eve, 1915, she attended a benefit matinee given for her at the New Grand Central Theater. She received scores of Christmas gifts from well-wishers, many of which she gave away to fellow patients.

== Criminal and civil law ==
At the insistence of State Factory Inspector A. Sidney Johnston, assistant City Prosecuting Attorney Wilson on December 16 issued four charges against E.W. Hummert, superintendent of the factory:

- That he permitted a child under 16 to operate a cylinder machine.
- That he permitted a child to work more than eight hours continuously.
- That he employed a child under 16.
- That he failed to provide a guard for a dangerous machine or post a notice that it was dangerous.

The punishment could be a fine or a term in the workhouse (jail). Johnston warned Hummert to cease operation of all machines in the factory which were not protected by guards.

Marie Moentmann filed suit against Fulton Bag and Cotton Mills of Atlanta, Georgia, on January 21, 1916, asking $100,000 in damages. She alleged the "managers of the factory should not have employed a girl under 16 years old to work at the machine" and that "safety appliances were removed, increasing the hazard of operation." Her petition claimed that she was "made helpless for life and will be wholly unable to care for herself."

On May 20, 1916, the case was settled, with $21,000 paid by the company, $16,000 to the girl and $5,000 to her parents, who were to pay all outstanding debts for Marie's medical care and legal expenses. When the young woman became an 18-year-old adult in September 1918, during World War 1, she invested her settlement in U.S. Liberty Bonds.

Superintendent Hummert pleaded guilty to two charges of violating the state labor law and on June 9 was fined $25 and costs on each. Inspector Johnson advised leniency because the company had paid a "large sum" to the victim and was "taking precautions" to act within the law from then on.

== Workers' compensation ==
Factory inspector Johnston blamed the State of Missouri for the incident because of "false economy" within the state factory department. He said there were only seven inspectors to check every establishment in the state, and only four in St. Louis. They were paid "only $100 a month" in the fees which they collected from the sites they visited, thus there was "no incentive ... to become proficient, particularly when the department is on a political basis and a fee basis."

Johnston said that "safety experts" should be paid at least $150 to $250 a month. He urged the passage of a workers' compensation law.

After Marie and her family settled with Fulton Bag, the St. Louis Post-Dispatch noted editorially that the case was "an extraordinary one" whose "prompt and handsome settlement" should not be used as an argument against adoption in Missouri of a state compensation law in case of industrial accidents. The newspaper said:

It has been a notorious fact that, in very many cases of injury to workmen, no one has been benefited by litigation except the lawyers. Meritorious cases have been appealed, time after time, until the resources and hopes of the injured workers were exhausted. Not even doctors' or hospital expenses have been paid.

The accident was used by Maurice J. Cassidy, secretary of L.U. 315, writing in The International Steam Engineer, to argue against the provisions of Missouri's workmen's compensation law, by which, he said, "Miss Moentmann would have had a hard road to travel under any compensation law now in existence. These laws, as now written, enrich the insurance companies and beggar the workers."

Marie Moentmann herself said three years later:

If the accident which deprived me of my hands and parts of my arms has resulted in throwing all the safety devices possible around the dangerous machinery in factories which employ boys and girls, and has brought about the passage of just compensation laws for the care of those who are maimed for life in such employments, then I am happy that my misfortune has accomplished some benefit for others. It is good to realize that the sacrifice was not in vain.

== Later life ==
In the first months of her recovery, suggestions were made that she be trained as a singer to earn her living. In May 1916, she said she had considered studying for the law so she could "fight for people who became unfortunate like myself, but ... it would take such a long time, and I haven't had much school work."

In 1919 at age 18, Moentmann told a reporter:

I keep myself well supplied with books. I guess there are not many patrons of the Public Library who make any better use of their cards than I do. I always have a supply on hand, and then I keep informed as to the newer ones. ... The player piano, which depends upon the exercise of the feet rather than the hands, is my most popular musical instrument, and I keep up with the good rolls. And there is my typewriter with its double keyboard, which does not require so much shifting.

Moentmann at her desk, with double-keyboard typewriter, from the St. Louis Post-Dispatch, June 12, 1931

By 1931, with the help of a friend, contractor H. Hinrichs Jr., Moentmann had become "saleswoman, manager and nominal owner of an electrical refrigerator sales business at 5542 South Grand boulevard." She had become adept at using her artificial hands, which were "controlled by cords motivated chiefly by her shoulder muscles."

She told reporter Marguerite Martyn that she had "cast about all these years in search of an occupation" and that she had once worked at the information desk at the Railway Exchange Building (St. Louis) and that she had taken courses at Washington University in St. Louis night school in English, literature, history and story telling. She gave up the latter, she said when she "came to realize that gestures with the hands are so much a part of story telling, especially to children, that I saw it was hopeless." She did keep on singing, with a church choir, but not as a professional.

She said she enjoyed her new work, adding:

Having to depend so much on mechanical devices, I have a great appreciation of mechanical perfection, and these ice machines are just wonderful, the things they do and the way they control themselves. And then I love meeting people. That is what I liked about that information job. Other people's problems take my mind off my own.

== Family ==
Marie Moentmann was born in St. Louis on September 6, 1900, to William and Marie Moentmann, both natives of Germany, or Czechoslovakia.

News reports described the father as a street cleaner; the 1910 census said he was a printer in a bag factory.

She had older siblings, Theresa and William, and a younger sister, Charlotte. She lived with her family during most of her life, her mother dying in 1933.

In October 1941, a marriage license was issued in St. Louis to Marie E. Moentmann of 8404 Michigan Avenue and Frank A. Wayt of 8106-A South Broadway. She outlived her husband and died as Marie E. Wayt at age 73 on July 15, 1974. Interment was at Trinity Lutheran Cemetery.

== Additional reading ==
- Marguerite Martyn, "Marguerite Martyn Finds That Girl Who Lost Arms in a Factory Is Resigned to Her Fate," St. Louis Post-Dispatch, December 25, 1915, image 3
- Jim Merkel, "1915 Accident Puts Focus on Improvements in Worker Safety," MetroSTL, September 2, 2019
