= Andover Chapter House =

- U.S. National Register of Historic Places
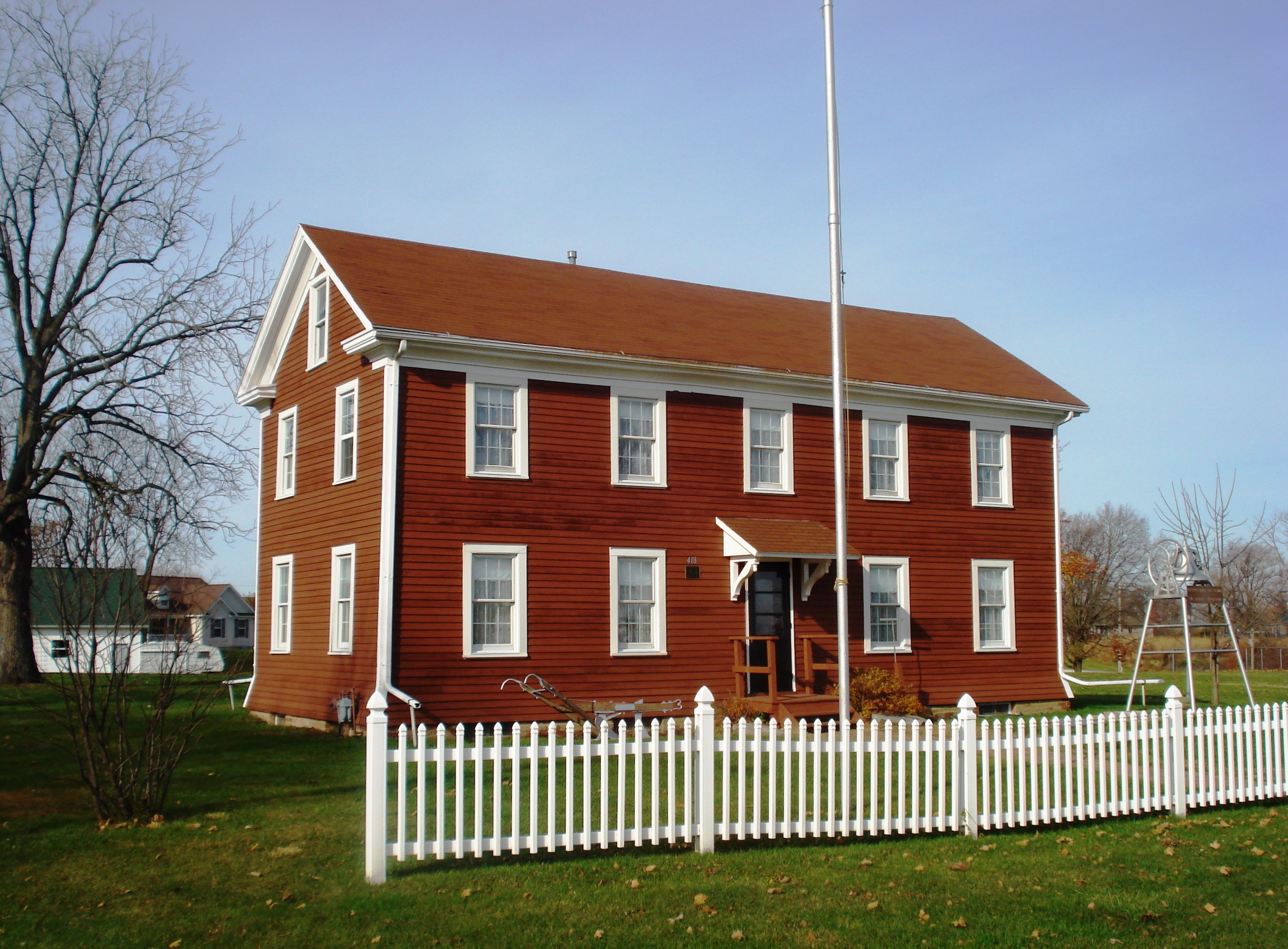
- Andover Chapter House, in 2011

- Location within Illinois Location within the United States
- Location: Locust St., NW; Andover, Illinois
- Coordinates: 41°17′39″N 90°17′32″W
- Area: 0.1 acres (0.040 ha)
- Architect: Helfensteller, Hirsch and Watson
- Architectural style: Prairie School
- MPS: American Woman's League Chapter Houses TR
- NRHP reference No.: 80001367
- Added to NRHP: November 28, 1980

The Andover Chapter House is a historic building located on Locust Street northwest of 5th Avenue in Andover, Illinois. The building was constructed between 1909 and 1910 as a meetinghouse for Andover's chapter of the American Woman's League. The American Woman's League was a political and social organization founded by magazine publisher Edward Gardner Lewis in 1908. The organization was created to promote feminist causes, particularly the women's suffrage movement; Lewis also intended for the organization to promote and sell his women's magazines. Lewis commissioned the St. Louis architectural firm of Helfensteller, Hirsch & Watson to design five classes of buildings which the League would use as meetinghouses. The Andover Chapter House is an example of a Class I building, which was designed for clubs with 30 to 60 members. The building was designed in the Prairie School style and cost $1,200. After the club disbanded, the building was converted to a private home.

The building was added to the National Register of Historic Places on November 28, 1980. It is one of nine American Woman's League chapter houses on the National Register in Illinois.
