= Deer Lodge American Women's League Chapter House =

- U.S. National Register of Historic Places
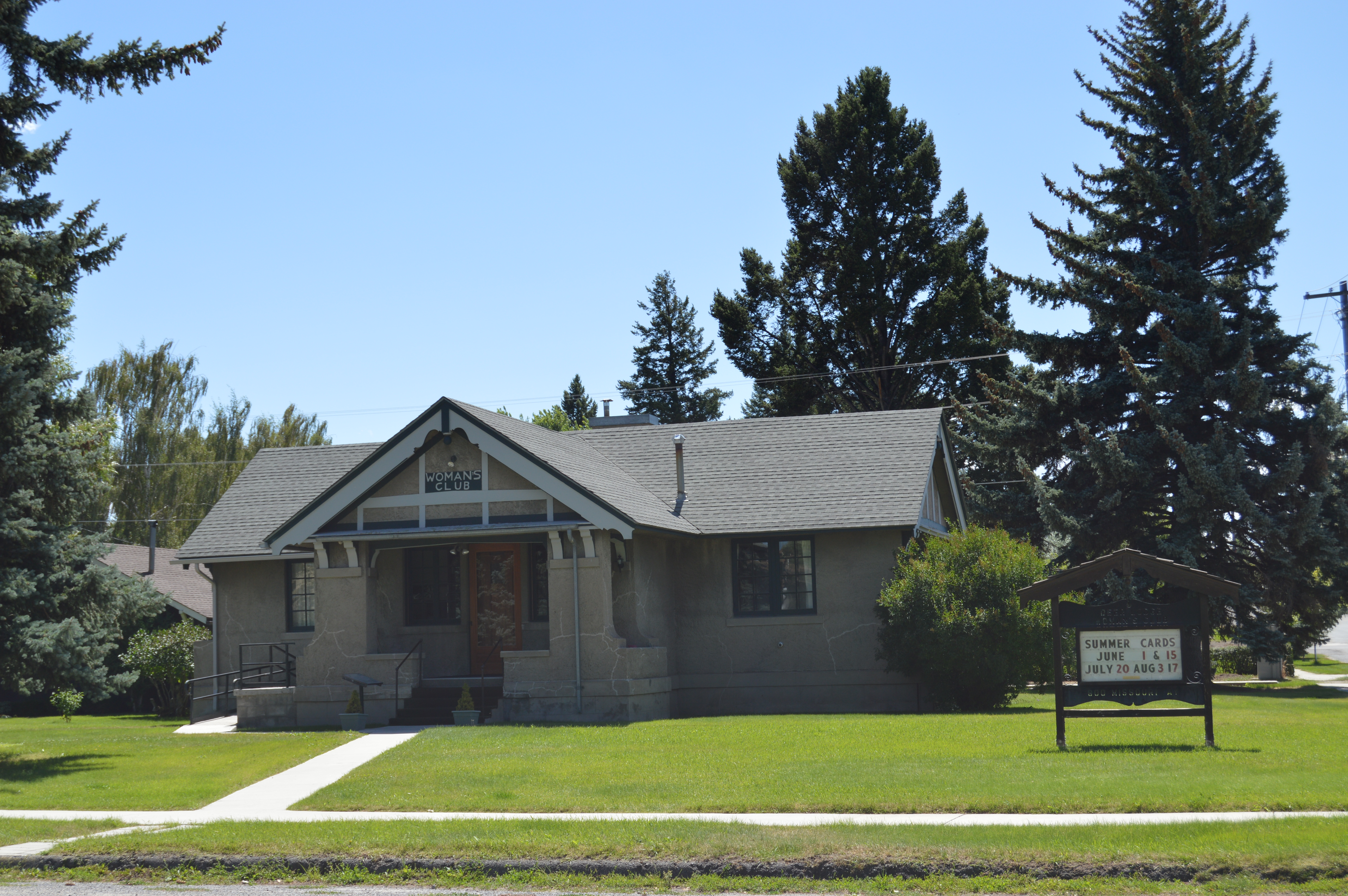

- Location within Montana Location within the United States
- Location: 802 Missouri Ave., Deer Lodge, Montana
- Coordinates: 46.39836°N 112.72685°W
- Area: less than one acre
- Built: 1910
- Built by: O'Neil & Bock
- Architect: Helfensteller, Hirsch & Watson
- Architectural style: Prairie School, Bungalow/Craftsman
- NRHP reference No.: 82003177
- Added to NRHP: June 14, 1982

The American Women's League Chapter House was built in 1910 by a local contractor, from plans with Prairie School and Bungalow/Craftsman influences designed by St. Louis architects Helfensteller, Hirsch & Watson. It was listed on the National Register of Historic Places in 1986.

It was deemed significant for its association with the American Women's League and for serving "for over 70 years as a center for women's civic and cultural activities within the community."

== See also ==
- List of women's clubs
- National Register of Historic Places listings in Powell County, Montana
