= Maywood Woman's Club =

- U.S. National Register of Historic Places
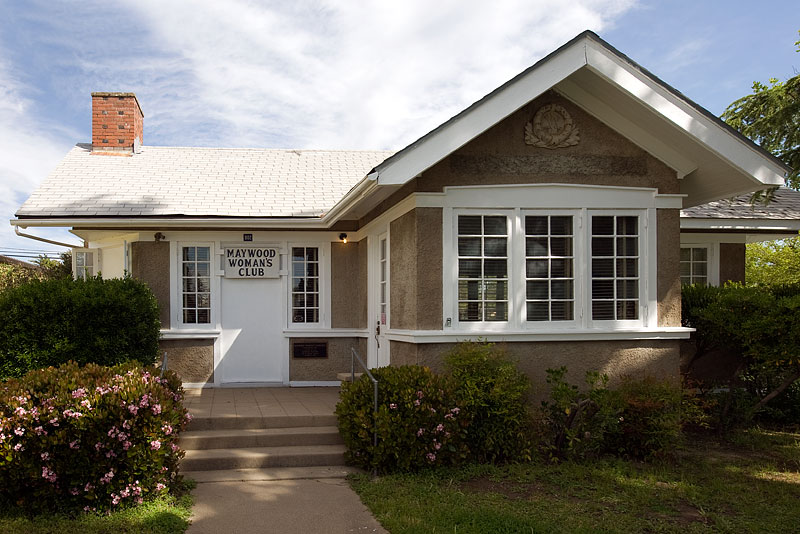
- Corning Chapter House

- Location within California Location within the United States
- Location: 902 Marin St., Corning, California
- Coordinates: 39°55′38″N 122°10′34″W
- Area: less than one acre
- Built: 1909
- Architect: Helfensteller, Hirsch & Watson
- Architectural style: Bungalow
- NRHP reference No.: 92001301
- Added to NRHP: October 2, 1992

The Maywood Woman's Club, also known as the American Woman's League Building, located in Corning, Tehama County, California.

The 1909 clubhouse was designed in Bungalow style by St. Louis architects Helfensteller, Hirsch & Watson as a "chapter house" for the American Woman's League.

It was listed on the National Register of Historic Places in 1992.

== See also ==
- National Register of Historic Places listings in Tehama County, California
- Clubhouses on the National Register of Historic Places in California
