= Liederkranz Club =

German-American social club

Coordinates: 38.6191°N 90.2032°W

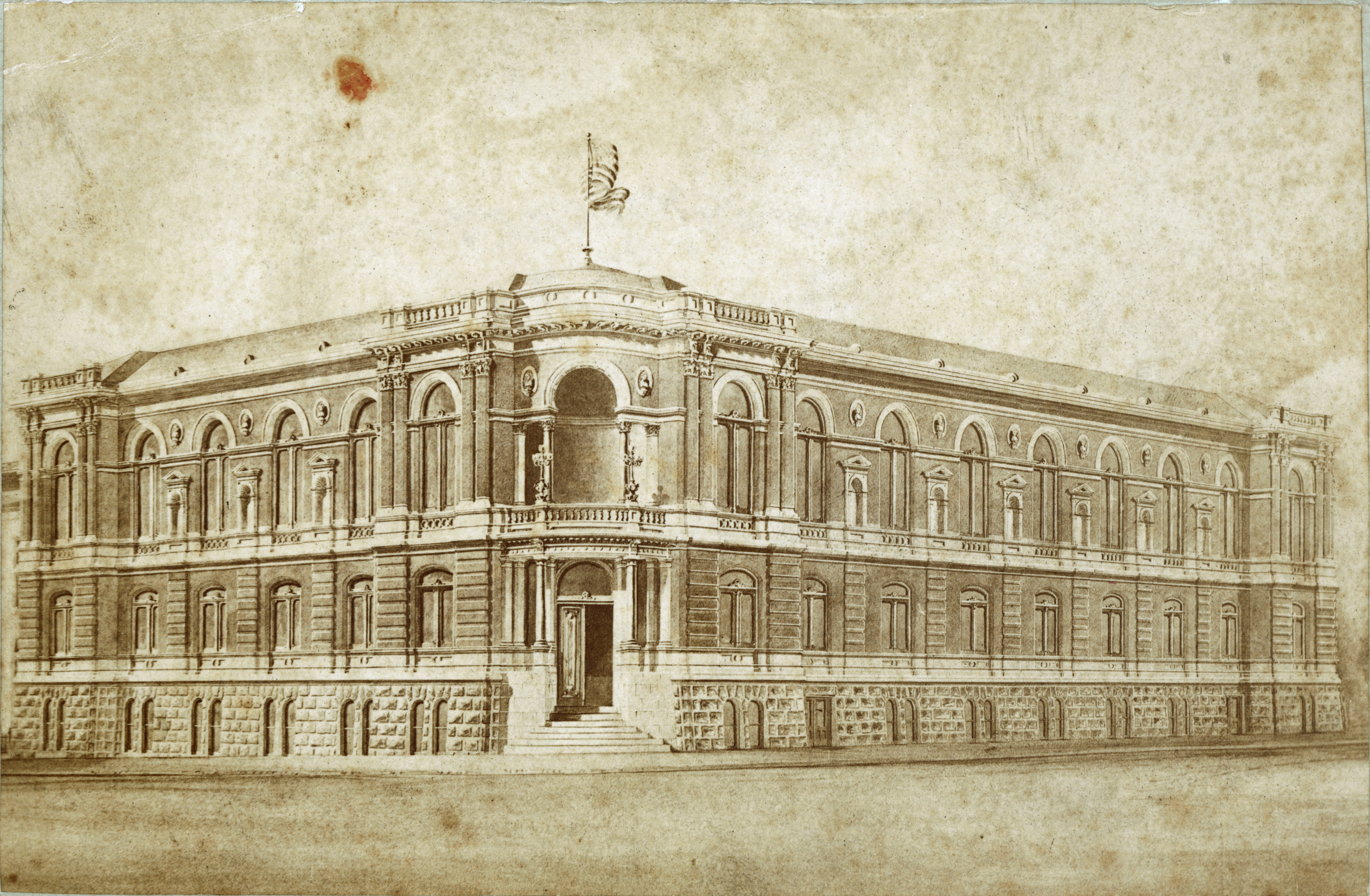
Liederkranz Hall, photograph by Boehl and Koenig, unknown date. The photo depicts Liederkranz Hall that was built ca. 1880 at Chouteau and 13th Street. A club building was built at South Grand and Magnolia ca. 1907.

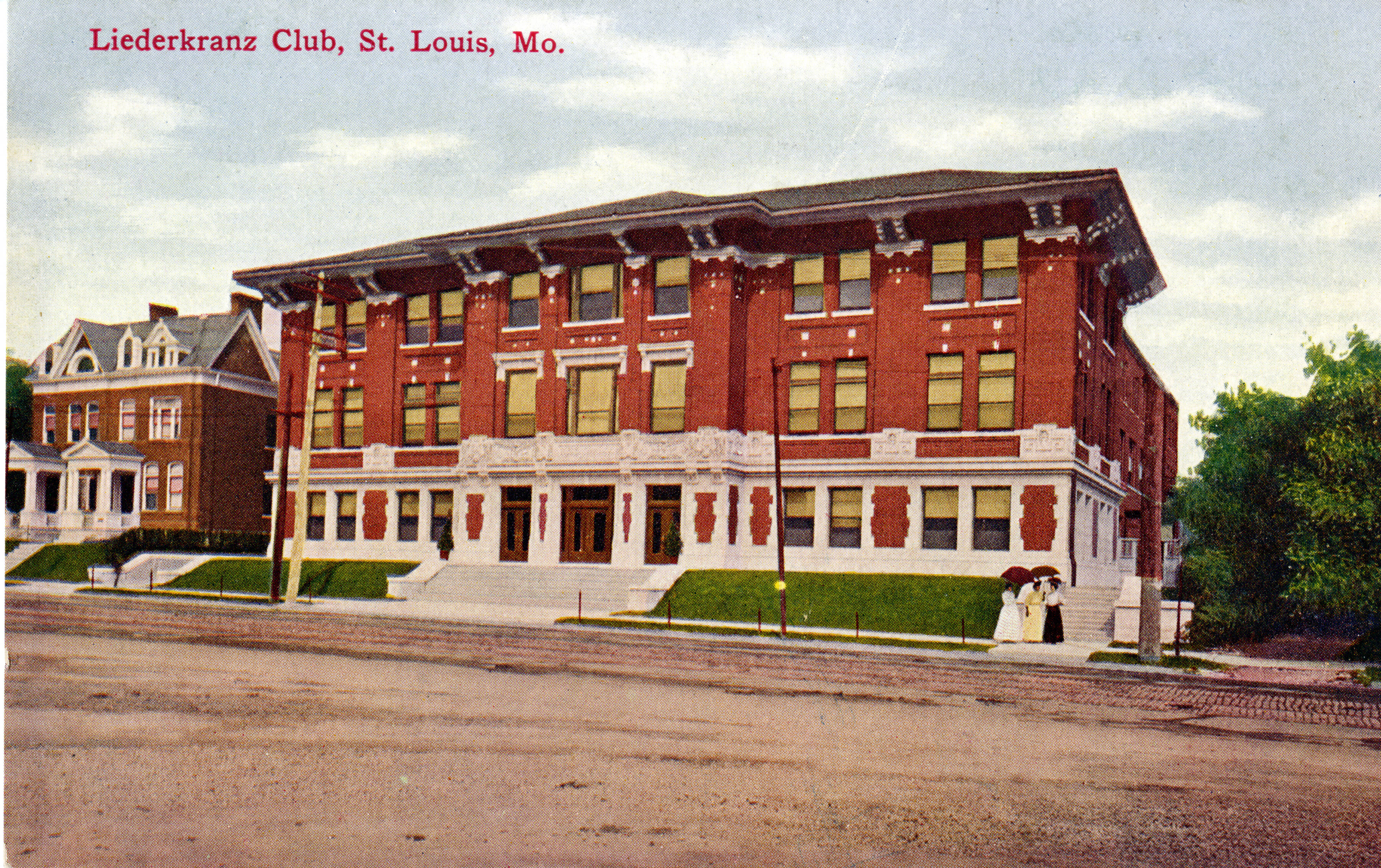
Postcard of Liederkranz Club, ca. 1910. This image shows the club building at South Grand and Magnolia.

The Liederkranz Club of St. Louis, Missouri was a German-American social club and the term also refers to its building. The building was a work of William Albert Hirsch of the St. Louis architectural firm Helfensteller, Hirsch & Watson.

The club, founded in 1870, was "considered the most exclusive social club among German-Americans in St. Louis". The club used a hall downtown until 1907 when it built a club house building on South Grand Avenue. According to a local history, the building "combined the facilities of both a social club and a saengerbund (choral society). Game rooms, a Rathskeller (guild hall), three dining areas, kitchen, bowling alleys, lounging and reading rooms, private parlors and meeting halls, concert and dancing hall, dressing rooms, rehearsal hall, musical library, and director's room were housed within its walls. During the social season the club sponsored a semimonthly ball, of which the German press printed glowing reports replete with the names of the most socially prominent in attendance and with elaborate descriptions of the women's gowns. The Liederkranz was the socially acceptable club for the more affluent German-Americans who wished to retain ties with the gemütlich (homey, friendly) community. Today the club is a choral performance group that seeks to preserve the rich tradition of German music in the St. Louis area. Rehearsals are held at the German Cultural Society on South Jefferson Ave in St. Louis. The group performs at various retirement and nursing homes in the area and has a concert and dinner in the fall of each year."

The 1907 building, on Grand and Magnolia, was sold on to a Masonic order branch in 1920 for $175,000. Prohibition had hurt the club's membership, making the building sale necessary. The building was demolished in 1963 and replaced by a supermarket.

President Ulysses S. Grant was photographed with the club.
