= New Grand Central Theatre =

Coordinates: 38°38′24″N 90°13′50″W

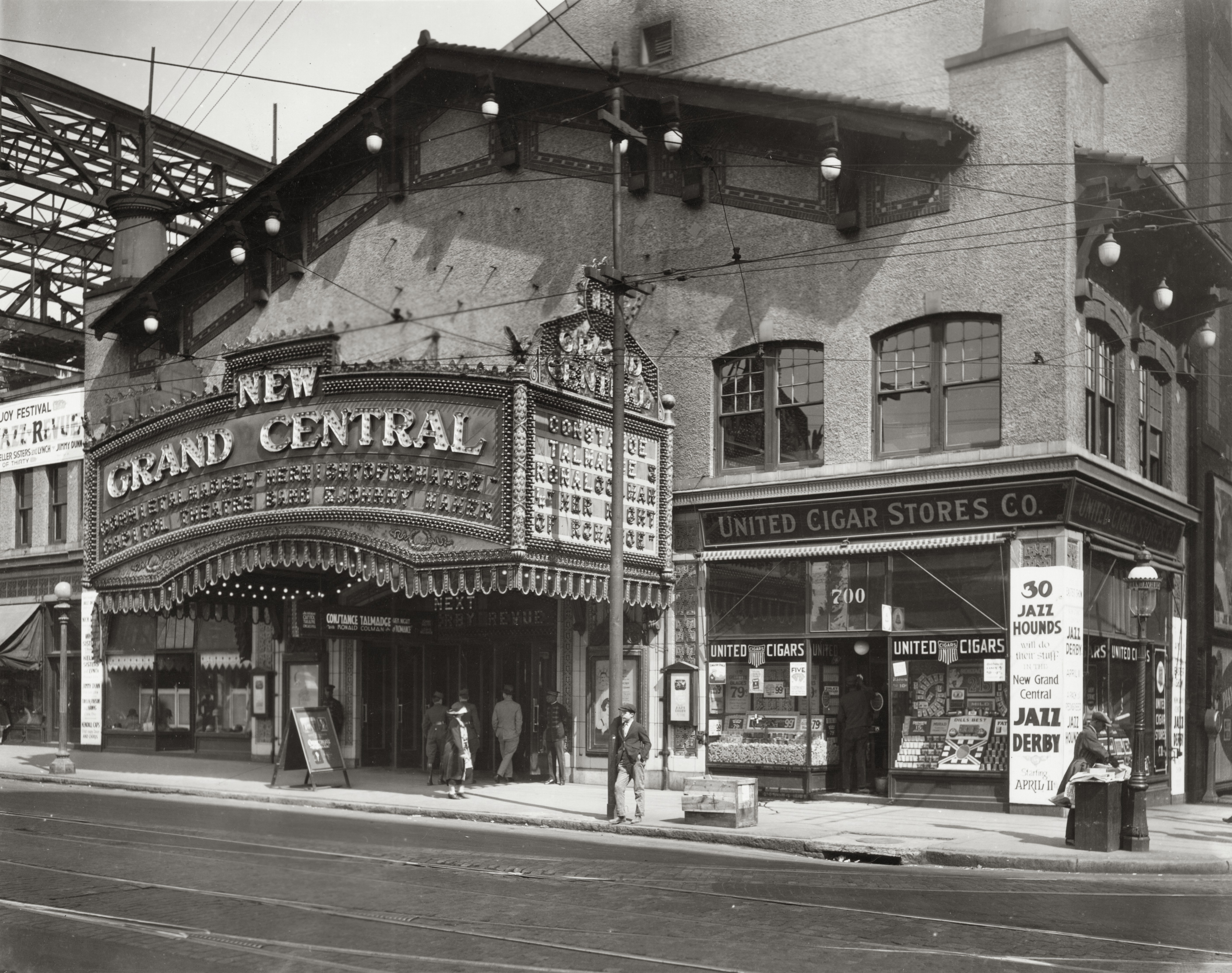
New Grand Central Theater, Grand Boulevard and Lucas Avenue in 1925

The New Grand Central Theatre (also spelled with Theater) was a movie theatre at 705 North Grand Avenue in St. Louis, Missouri. It was designed by St. Louis architects Helfensteller, Hirsch & Watson and was built in 1913.

It was built as Grand Central Theatre by the Skouras Brothers as a 1,750 theater for showing of motion pictures, unusual for the time. It cost $150,000. The theater was the host location for the first St. Louis "talkie", Al Jolson in The Jazz Singer. The theater was also the first St. Louis theater to show an all-color talking and singing musical, On with the Show, in June 1929. It was renovated and became the New Grand Central Theatre in 1921. The 2,500 seat renovated theatre had room for a 21 piece orchestra and a Wonder Kilgen organ.

It was closed in 1931 and reopened in 1935 under new management. The building was demolished in 1949 and replaced by a parking lot.

== See also ==
- Marie Moentmann (1900-1974), industrial accident survivor whose benefit was held here, 1915
