= Olof Johnson House =

Historic house in Illinois, United States

- U.S. National Register of Historic Places
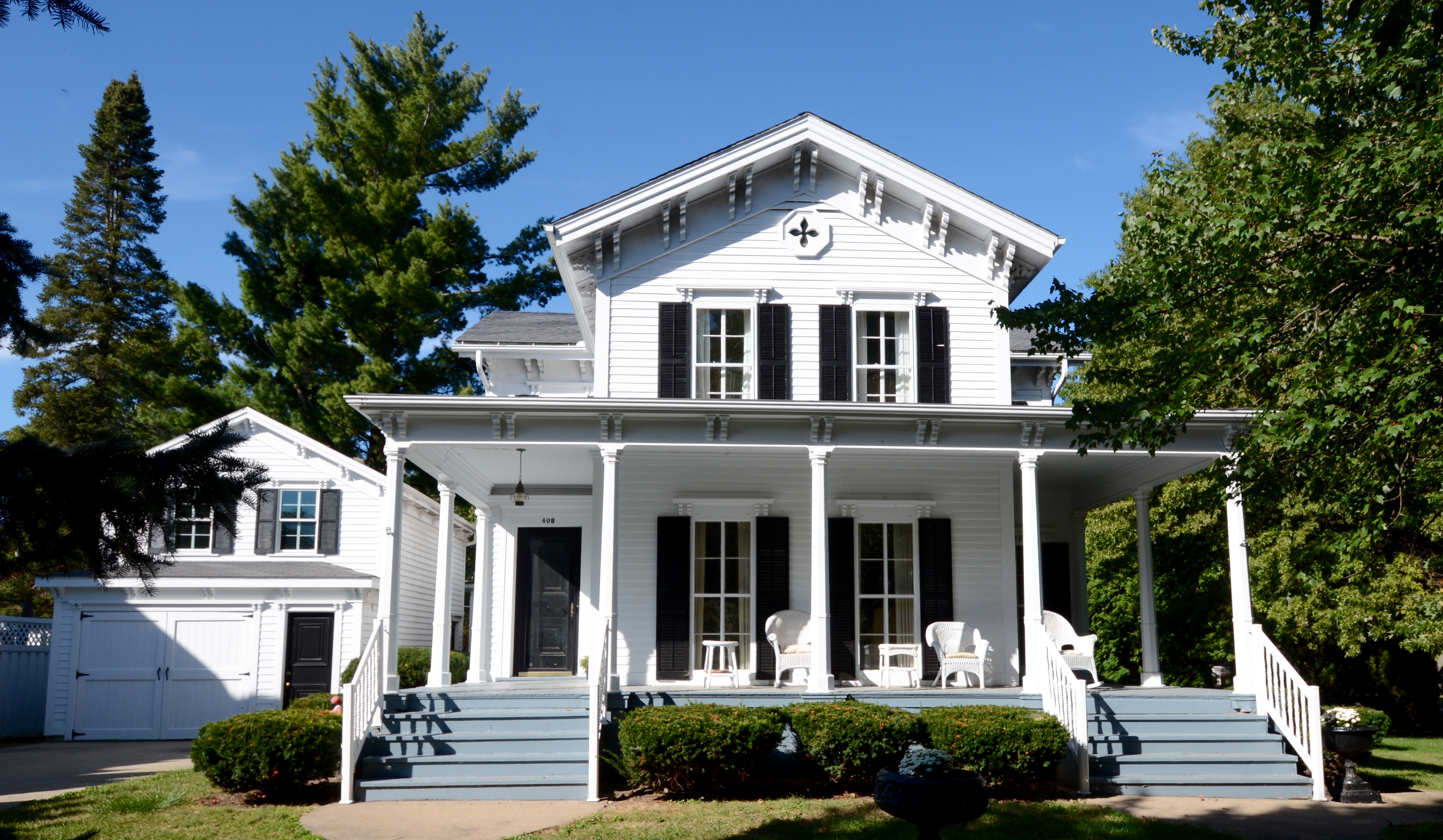

- Location within Illinois Location within the United States
- Location: 408 NW 4th St. Galva, Illinois
- Coordinates: 41°10′12″N 90°2′52″W
- Area: 0.4 acres (0.16 ha)
- Built: 1863
- Architectural style: Italianate
- NRHP reference No.: 82002539
- Added to NRHP: February 11, 1982

The Olof Johnson House is a historic house located at 408 NW 4th Street in Galva, Illinois. The house was built in 1863 for Olof Johnson, one of the trustees of the Bishop Hill Colony. In addition to his position within the colony, Johnson also played a significant role in Galva's founding and named the community after his birthplace of Gävle, Sweden. Johnson's house has an Italianate design, a popular style in the late 19th century. The house's wraparound front porch is supported by thin columns and features paired brackets along its roof; similar brackets can be found on the eaves of the house's cross gabled roof.

The house was added to the National Register of Historic Places on February 11, 1982.
