= Woman's Club =

Woman's Club or Women's Club may refer to:

- List of women's clubs

== Woman's club movement in the United States ==
- Woman's club movement in the United States
  - List of women's clubs § United States
  - General Federation of Women's Clubs

== Film ==
- Women's Club (1936 film), or Club de femmes, a French film
- Women's Club (1956 film), or Club de femmes, a French-Italian drama film

== See also ==
- Woman's Club House (disambiguation)
- Women-only space
