= Woman's Club House (Manhattan, Kansas) =

- U.S. National Register of Historic Places
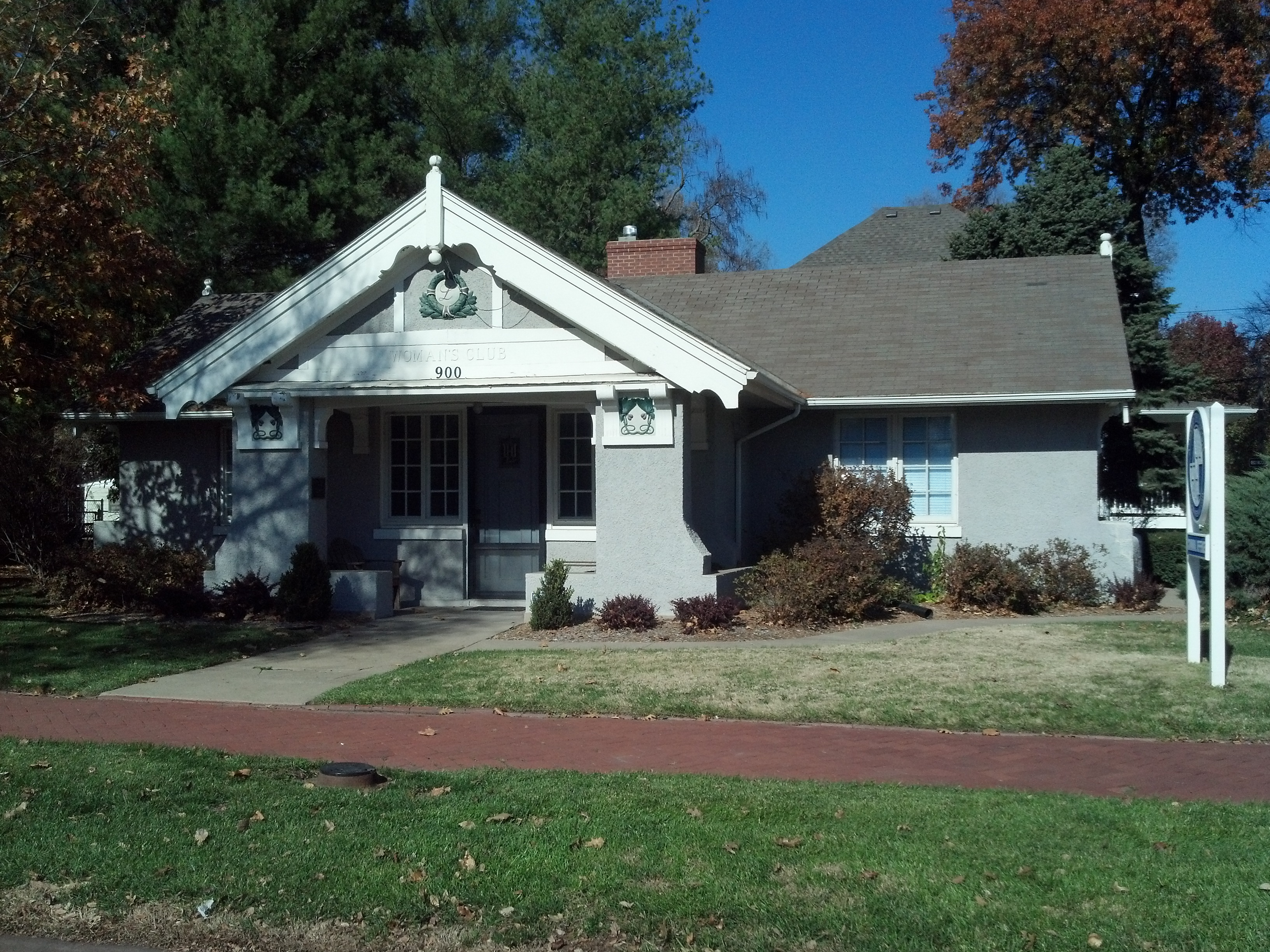

- Location within Kansas Location within the United States
- Location: 900 Poyntz Ave., Manhattan, Kansas
- Coordinates: 39°10′46″N 96°34′13″W
- Area: 1 acre (0.40 ha)
- Built: 1911
- Architect: Helfensteller, Hirsch & Watson
- Architectural style: Bungalow/Craftsman, Arts and Crafts
- NRHP reference No.: 80001472
- Added to NRHP: November 28, 1980

The Woman's Club House in Manhattan, Kansas was built in 1911. It was designed by St. Louis, Missouri architects Helfensteller, Hirsch & Watson. It was listed on the U.S. National Register of Historic Places in 1980.
