= Galva Opera House =

- U.S. National Register of Historic Places
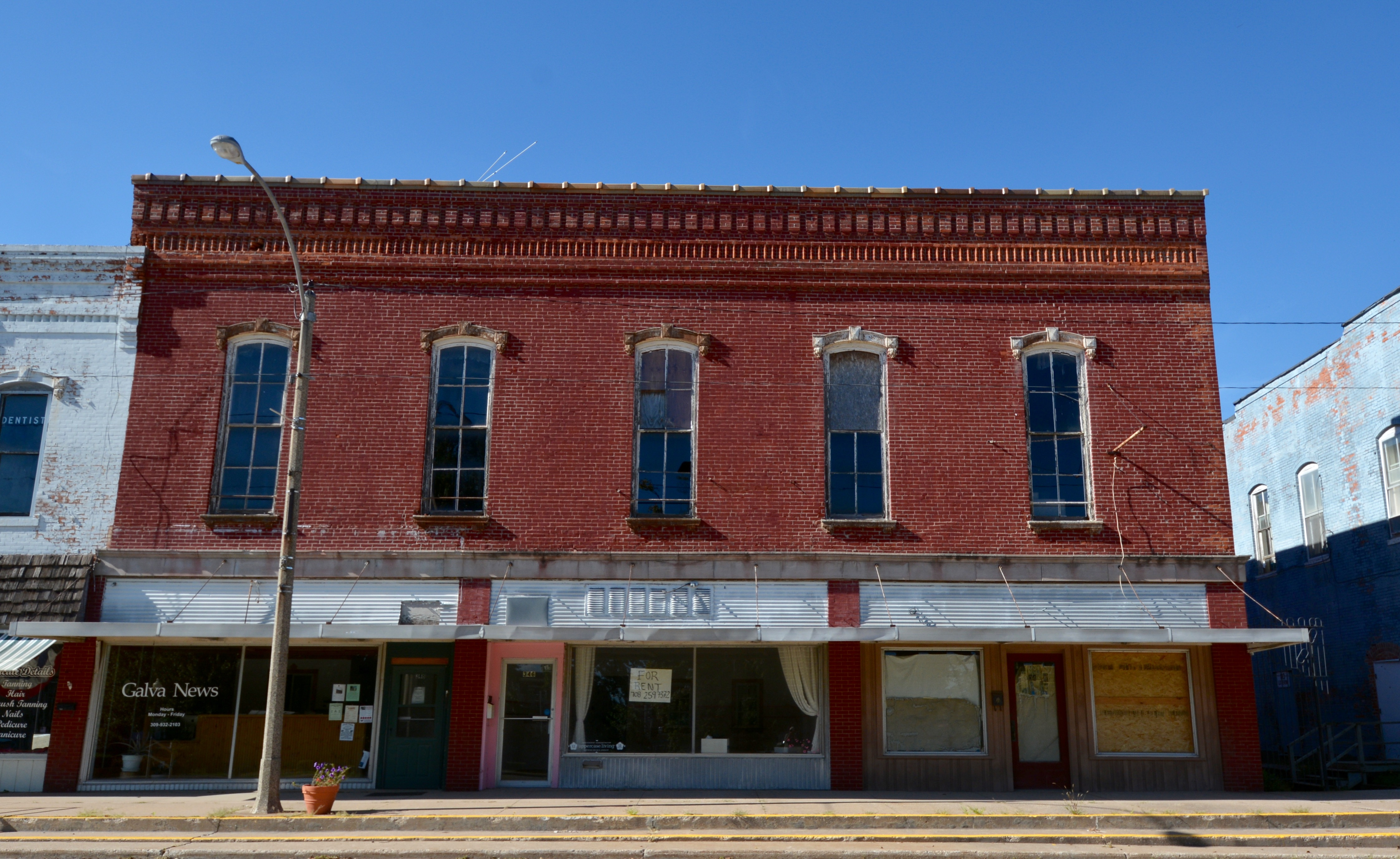

- Location within Illinois Location within the United States
- Location: 334-348 Front St. Galva, Illinois
- Coordinates: 41°9′57″N 90°2′32″W
- Area: less than one acre
- Built: 1878
- Built by: Price & Payne
- NRHP reference No.: 82002538
- Added to NRHP: February 11, 1982

The Galva Opera House is a historic theater located at 334-348 Front Street in Galva, Illinois. Built in 1878, the theater opened as the Blue Ribbon Temperance Hall; by 1886, it had lost its association with the temperance movement and was known by its present name. Galva's location on two major railroad lines allowed traveling theatrical troupes to visit the theater; shows produced by local talent performed in the building as well. Local schools also used the building for their graduation ceremonies, sporting events, and school plays until Galva High School opened its own auditorium in 1932. The building was used as a roller skating rink in the 1920s and 1930s and hosted Lions Club events in the 1950s.

The building was added to the National Register of Historic Places on February 11, 1982.

In 2020 the City Council accepted the only proposal for the Galva Opera House block at a special meeting. The proposal came from Brian Anderson of Galva, owner of Anderson Family Coffee which opened in Galva in 2019. Anderson said his proposal includes investing about $237,000 as part of a four-year plan to renovate the building. Anderson said his plans include having his coffee shop in the far east storefront. In the middle of three ground-level storefronts, he envisions a coffee lounge and craft and gift shop.

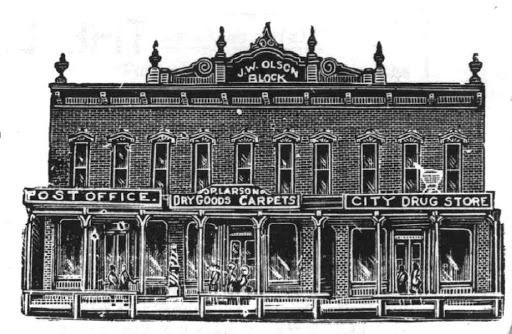
Galva Opera House - Blue Ribbon Temperance Hall

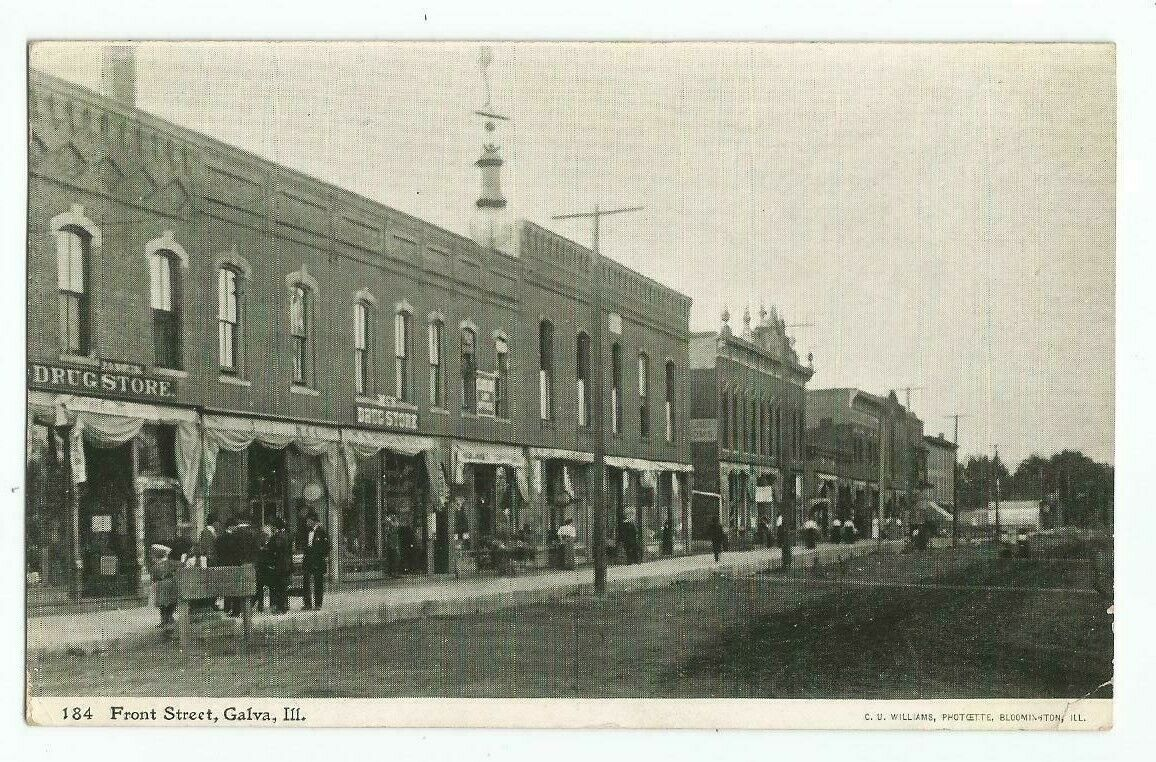
Galva - 1909 Front Street Scene
