= Peck, Idaho =

- City
- Location of Peck in Nez Perce County, Idaho
- Coordinates: 46°28′26″N 116°25′30″W
- Country: United States
- State: Idaho
- County: Nez Perce

Area
  - Total: 0.25 sq mi (0.65 km^{2})
  - Land: 0.25 sq mi (0.65 km^{2})
  - Water: 0 sq mi (0.00 km^{2})
- Elevation: 1,089 ft (332 m)

Population (2020)
  - Total: 166
  - Estimate (2024): 172
  - Density: 775.6/sq mi (299.45/km^{2})
- Time zone: UTC-8 (Pacific (PST))
  - Summer (DST): UTC-7 (PDT)
- ZIP code: 83545
- Area codes: 208, 986
- FIPS code: 16-61840
- GNIS feature ID: 0397986
- Website: cityofpeck.org

Peck is a city in Nez Perce County, Idaho, United States. As of the 2020 census, Peck had a population of 166. It is part of the Lewiston, ID-WA Metropolitan Statistical Area. Many residents of Peck work in nearby Orofino, Idaho. Additionally, Peck residents attend high school in Orofino since Peck does not have a high school.

== Geography ==
Peck is located at 46°28′26″N 116°25′30″W (46.473786, -116.425083).

According to the United States Census Bureau, the city has a total area of 0.27 square miles (0.70 km^{2}), all of it land. There is a small creek.

== Demographics ==
Historical population
| Census | Pop. | Note | %± |
|---|---|---|---|
| 1910 | 236 | | — |
| 1920 | 191 | | −19.1% |
| 1930 | 164 | | −14.1% |
| 1940 | 165 | | 0.6% |
| 1950 | 170 | | 3.0% |
| 1960 | 186 | | 9.4% |
| 1970 | 238 | | 28.0% |
| 1980 | 209 | | −12.2% |
| 1990 | 160 | | −23.4% |
| 2000 | 186 | | 16.3% |
| 2010 | 197 | | 5.9% |
| 2020 | 166 | | −15.7% |
| 2024 (est.) | 172 | | 3.6% |
U.S. Decennial Census

=== 2010 census ===
As of the census of 2010, there were 197 people, 87 households, and 59 families residing in the city. The population density was 729.6 inhabitants per square mile (281.7/km^{2}). There were 95 housing units at an average density of 351.9 per square mile (135.9/km^{2}). The racial makeup of the city was 95.4% White, 1.0% Native American, and 3.6% from two or more races. Hispanic or Latino people of any race were 0.5% of the population.

There were 87 households, of which 26.4% had children under the age of 18 living with them, 56.3% were married couples living together, 9.2% had a female householder with no husband present, 2.3% had a male householder with no wife present, and 32.2% were non-families. 26.4% of all households were made up of individuals, and 12.6% had someone living alone who was 65 years of age or older. The average household size was 2.26 and the average family size was 2.75.

The median age in the city was 49.2 years. 19.3% of residents were under the age of 18; 2.5% were between the ages of 18 and 24; 20.9% were from 25 to 44; 35.6% were from 45 to 64; and 21.8% were 65 years of age or older. The gender makeup of the city was 50.8% male and 49.2% female.

=== 2000 census ===
As of the census of 2000, there were 186 people, 87 households, and 62 families residing in the city. The population density was 693.2 inhabitants per square mile (267.6/km^{2}). There were 96 housing units at an average density of 357.8 per square mile (138.1/km^{2}). The racial makeup of the city was 98.39% White and 1.61% Native American.

There were 87 households, out of which 23.0% had children under the age of 18 living with them, 63.2% were married couples living together, 8.0% had a female householder with no husband present, and 28.7% were non-families. 27.6% of all households were made up of individuals, and 14.9% had someone living alone who was 65 years of age or older. The average household size was 2.14 and the average family size was 2.58.

In the city, the population was spread out, with 17.7% under the age of 18, 2.2% from 18 to 24, 26.9% from 25 to 44, 19.9% from 45 to 64, and 33.3% who were 65 years of age or older. The median age was 48 years. For every 100 females, there were 93.8 males. For every 100 females age 18 and over, there were 82.1 males.

The median income for a household in the city was $27,500, and the median income for a family was $29,531. Males had a median income of $36,250 versus $28,750 for females. The per capita income for the city was $14,863. About 16.0% of families and 13.2% of the population were below the poverty line, including 11.9% of those under the age of eighteen and 11.6% of those 65 or over.
