= Edward Gardner Lewis =

American publisher (1869–1950)

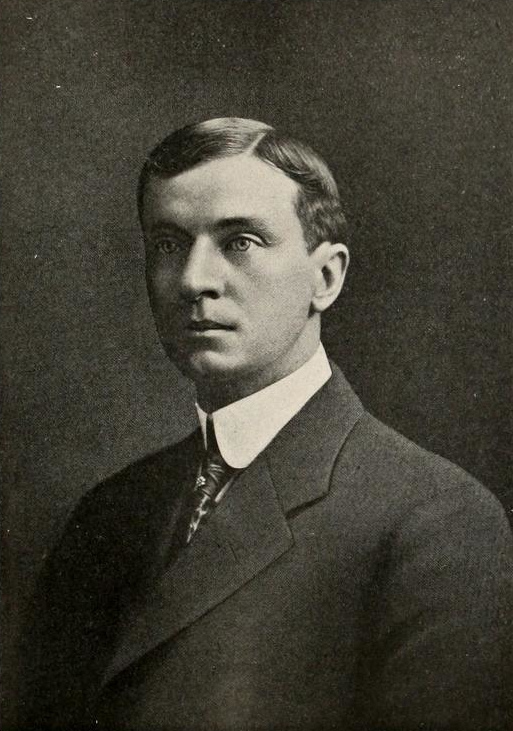
E. G. Lewis

Edward Gardner Lewis (March 4, 1869 – August 10, 1950) was an American magazine publisher, land development promoter, and political activist. He was the founder of two planned communities that are now cities: University City, Missouri, and Atascadero, California. He created the American Woman's League (1907), a benefits fund for women who sold magazine subscriptions, as well as the American Woman's Republic (1911), a parallel organization designed to help women prepare themselves for a future in which they would have the right to vote. He also founded the People's University and its associated Art Academy in University City, as well as two daily newspapers and two banks.

== Early history ==
Lewis was born in Connecticut in 1869. After attending private schools, he got his bachelor's degree at Trinity College.

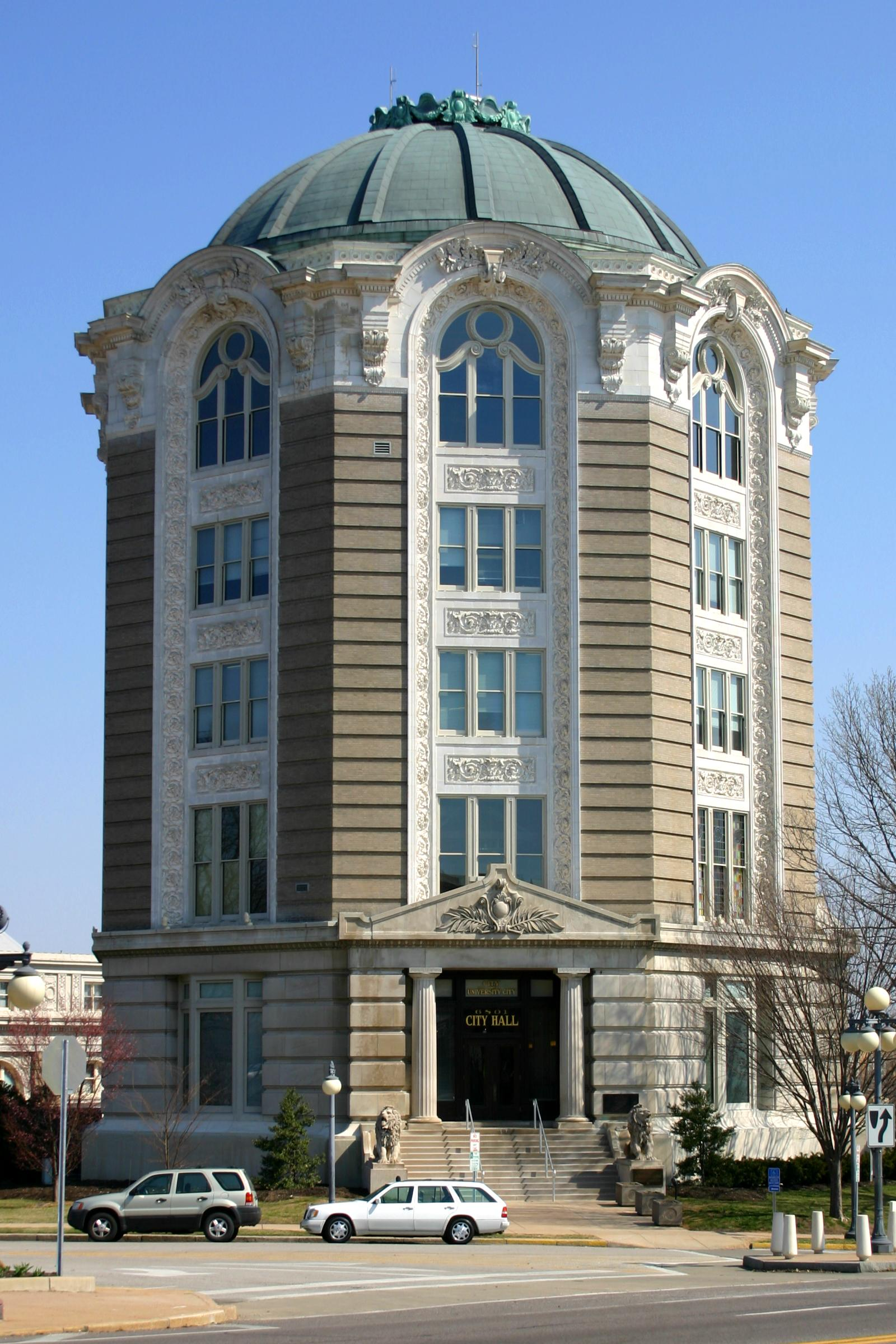
Woman's Magazine Building in University City, built 1903, now City Hall.

== Lewis Publishing Company and University City, Missouri ==
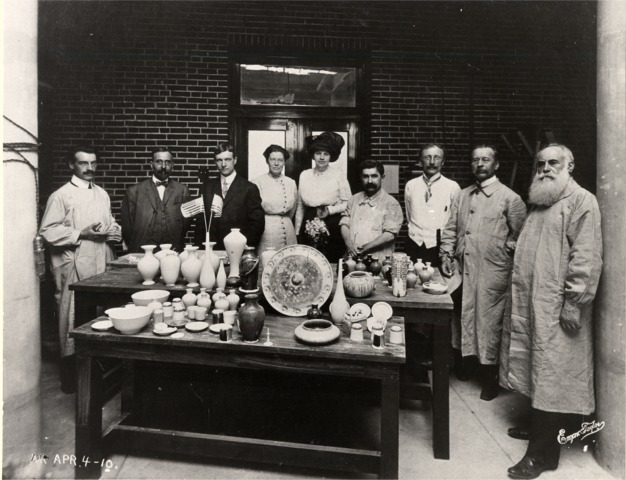
Edward Gardner Lewis (third from left) and others at the Art Academy of People's University in University City, Missouri, in 1910, celebrating the first kiln there.

Lewis moved to St. Louis, Missouri, in the late 1890s, where he worked as a salesman of insect extermination products and medicines that were said to be highly questionable. He bought a local magazine called Winner and renamed it Woman's Magazine. He quickly built its circulation to a million and a half, amassing a fortune in the process. He also acquired another periodical, the Woman's Farm Journal.

In 1902, Lewis purchased 85 acres near the construction site for the 1904 St. Louis World's Fair, which became the nucleus of what is now University City, Missouri. In 1903, when his publishing operation outgrew its downtown St. Louis location, he began building a new Lewis Publishing Company headquarters and Press Annex at this site. After incorporating University City in 1906, he served three terms as mayor.

=== People's University and People's Bank ===
Between 1903 and 1915, Lewis continued to acquire surrounding parcels and develop subdivisions, building the octagonal Woman's Magazine Building (now City Hall) and an exotic, windowless Egyptian Building across the street (since destroyed).

In 1909, he founded a college called People's University. Only one of its three planned buildings was completed: the art building, designed in the Classical Revival style by St. Louis architects Eames & Young and built in 1909 and 1910. The school was most noted for its Art Academy, where such artists Adelaïde Alsop Robineau, Frederick Hurten Rhead, and Taxile Doat worked. Its director was Hungarian immigrant George Julian Zolnay, who was known as the "sculptor of the Confederacy".

Lewis also established two daily newspapers and two banks, one of which — the "People's Bank" — was shut down by Postmaster General George B. Cortelyou because it would have offered mail-order services in direct competition with U.S. postal money orders.

== American Woman's League ==
Penny-per-pound postage rates and Rural Free Delivery had brought Lewis a large rural readership for his two magazines, and mail order ads in the magazines allowed him to sell annual subscriptions for pennies and still make money. However, Lewis attracted the enmity of Postmaster General Cortelyou, who claimed that the magazines primarily functioned as advertising and therefore did not qualify for the magazine rate. Cortelyou accused him of defrauding the Post Office, and Lewis spent much of 1907 fighting the Post Office in court.

Although Lewis eventually won the right to mail his periodicals at the magazine rate, he had lost many subscribers along the way. In 1907, in an effort to rebuild circulation, he founded the American Woman's League (AWL). At the time, magazine publishers often paid individuals a small fee to sell magazine subscriptions. In Lewis's plan, women who sold a certain base number of subscriptions would earn a free membership in the AWL. Their subscription fees would go into the AWL, funding a pool of benefits such as education and pensions to which all AWL members were entitled. The AWL proved to be a very popular concept and some 700 chapters were formed across the United States. However, the AWL struggled to make its funding model work, and it folded in 1912.

== American Woman's Republic ==
In 1911, Lewis founded the American Woman's Republic (AWR) as a parallel organization to the American Woman's League. Funded by membership fees, the AWR was a kind of model republic designed to help women educate themselves in government and otherwise prepare themselves for a future in which they would have the right to vote.

The AWR held its first convention the following year, ratifying a declaration of equal rights. AWR members took part in other suffrage organizations and became involved with the Women's Peace Army during World War I.

Shortly after founding the AWR, Gardner decided to establish a new agrarian colony for the republic in what is now Atascadero, California (see next section). Although the capitol of the AWR was designated as University City until 1916, the rest of the republic's various ventures moved to Atascadero much sooner.

Not much is known about the AWR's activities after 1916, even though it was intended to remain politically active until American women won the right to vote, which did not happen until 1919.

== Atascadero, California, and World War I ==
In 1913, Lewis put together a group of investors to buy up land in San Luis Obispo County, California, starting with Rancho Atascadero. He intended to establish a utopian colony there for the American Woman's Republic. Starting in 1914, the land was subdivided, thousands of acres of orchards were planted, and a road was built from Atascadero to the Pacific coast at Morro Bay that is now a section of State Route 41.

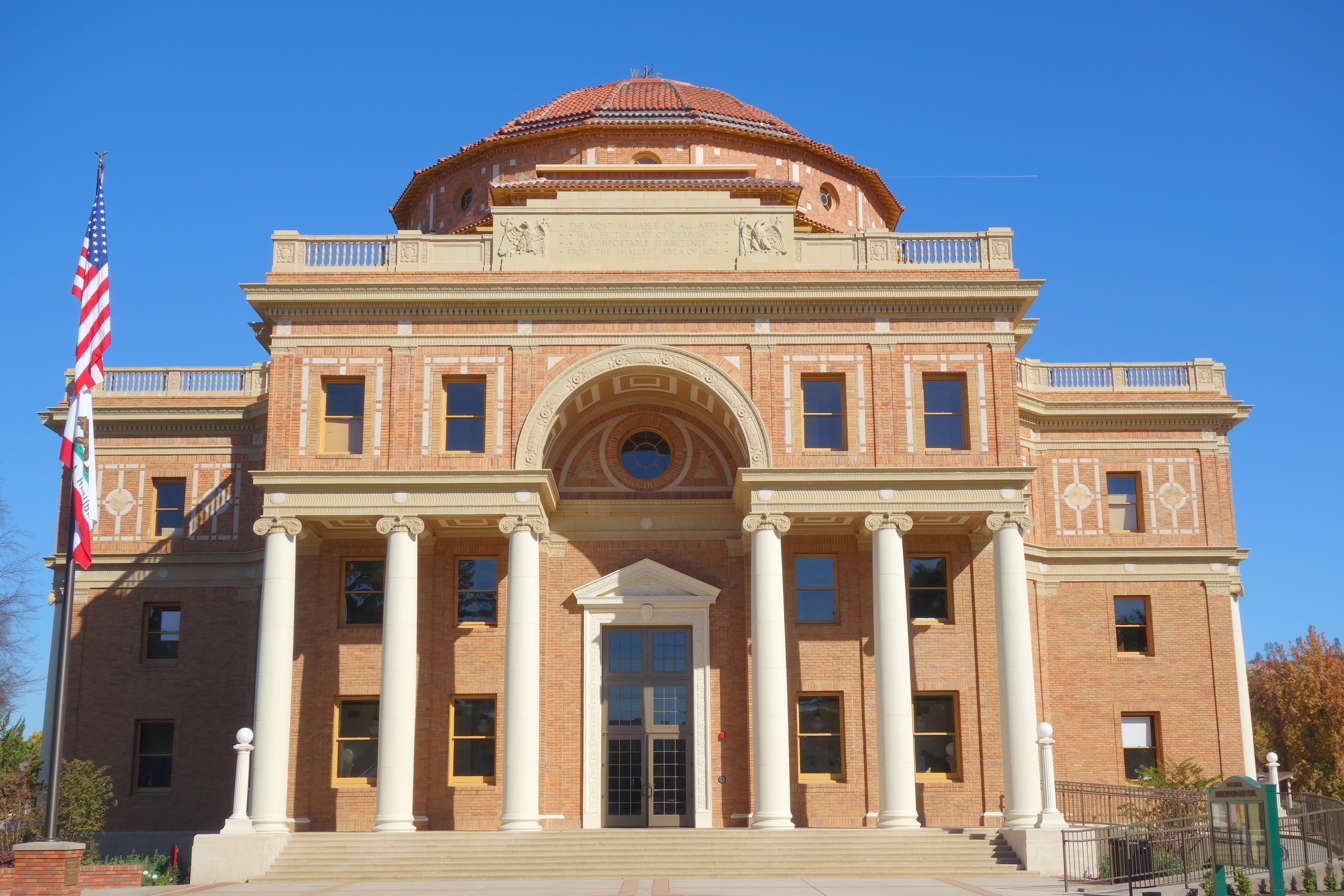
Atascadero City Hall.

The first building in the new community was a print shop that had the first rotogravure presses west of Chicago. The Atascadero Printery is now a listed building on the National Register of Historic Places. The architectural centerpiece of the town was the city hall and museum, an Italian Renaissance–style building built of local-clay bricks that was damaged in the 2003 San Simeon earthquake. It is no. 958 on the list of California Historical Landmarks.

In Atascadero, Lewis also built what was claimed to be the "largest dehydrating plant in the world," which supplied the U.S. Army with dehydrated vegetables. Profits from this venture went towards the acquisition of 16,000 acres of leases in Wyoming, where he drilled for oil with scant success. When the war ended, the U.S. government canceled the dehydrating plant contract and Lewis found himself once more in dire financial straits.

== Palos Verdes Project ==
Around 1922, Lewis acquired options to buy 16,000 acres of land on the Palos Verdes peninsula from banker Frank A. Vanderlip. He drew up plans for a new city on the peninsula, the construction of which was to be financed by the sale of sale of trust indenture notes. Although the project generated much publicity and thousands of people attended sales meetings in 1922, the project's detractors managed to create a great deal of controversy around it. Lewis's involvement with the project ended in 1923, and he declared bankruptcy in 1924.

== Later life and death ==
In 1927, Lewis was indicted for the second time for conspiracy to use the U.S. mail system to defraud people. Acting as his own attorney, he was found guilty and sentenced to five years at the McNeil Island Federal Prison.

Little is known about Lewis's subsequent life. He died on August 10, 1950.

== Legacy ==
A number of landmarks and events are named after Lewis in University City and Atascadero. In University City, a marker in front of City Hall describes Lewis as a "banker, planner, developer, builder, publisher, inventor, artist, dreamer, [and] visionary" who "left us with a remarkable legacy."

The section of California State Route 41 between Atascadero and Morro Bay is now officially designated the "E.G. Lewis Highway".

== See also ==
- Garden Farms, California
