= Ebell =

Ebell can refer to:

- Adrian John Ebell (1840-1877), Sri Lankan-born US educator and photographer
- Myron Ebell (f. 2000s), US advocate against global warming theory
- Tyler Ebell (born 1983), Canadian athlete in professional football
- Ebell of Los Angeles, a woman's educational club based on principles of Adrian John Ebell.
- Ebell Club of Santa Paula, a woman's educational club chapter based on principles of Adrian John Ebell.
