= Mabel Barnett Gates =

Mabel Barnett Gates (1875 - June 1944) was active in club and civic affairs in the Los Angeles County.

== Early life ==
Mabel Barnett was born in 1875 in Keokuk, Iowa, the daughter of Frank Barnett (1832-1920) and Naomi Barrett (1837-1926).

== Career ==
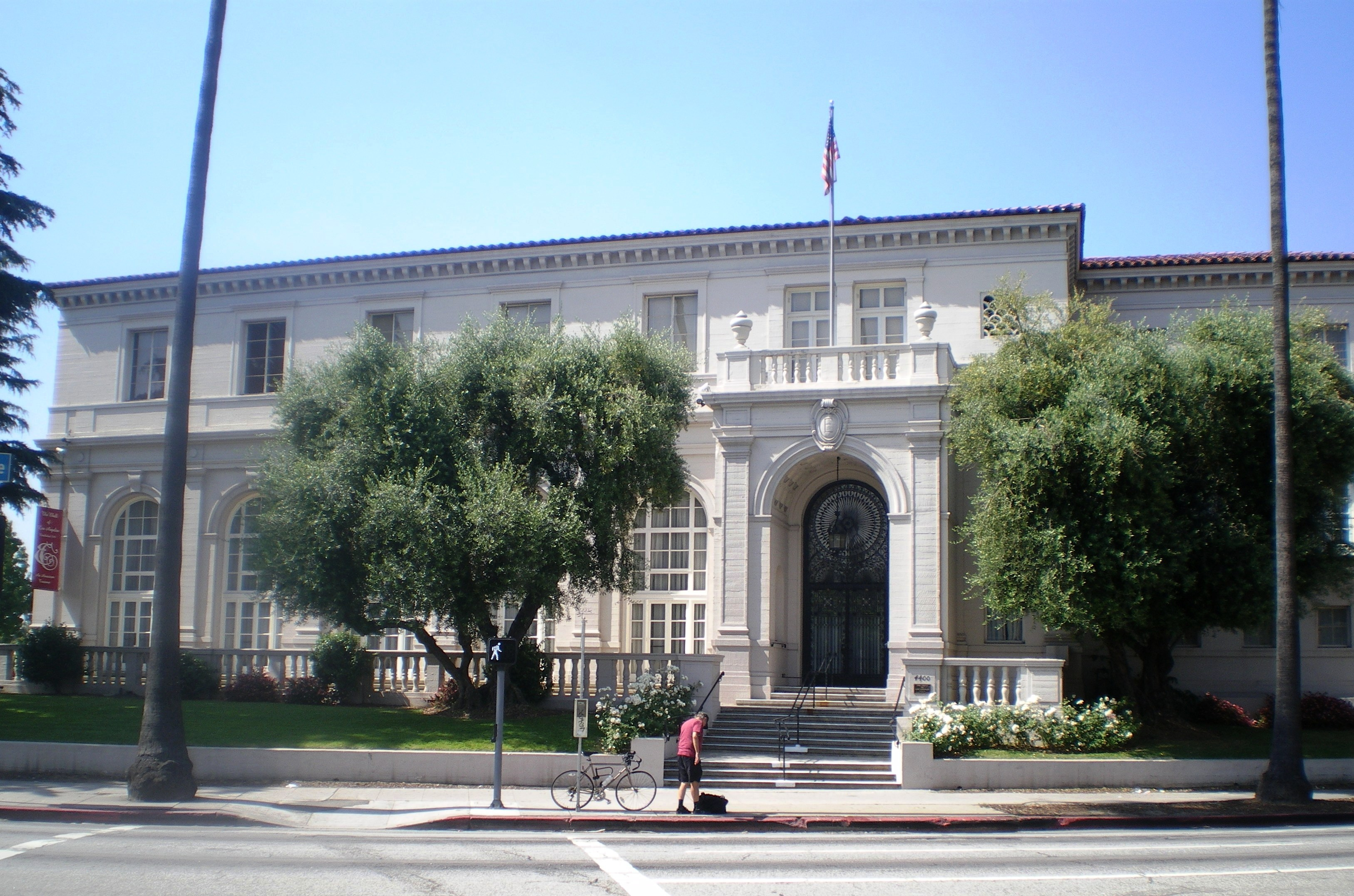
Ebell of Los Angeles, Los Angeles

Mabel Barnett Gates was very active in club and civic affairs.

She was the first vice-president Ebell of Los Angeles and president of the Los Angeles Browning Society. In 1915 Gates represented Ebell Club at the 14th annual California Federation of Women's Club in San Francisco. In 1920 she contributed a poem, To Robert Browning, to the anthology Homage to Robert Browning.

She was first vice-president of La Canada Thursday Club.

She was on the committees for Hospitality, Finance and Browning Class of the Hollywood Club.

== Personal life ==
Mabel Barnett Gates move to California in 1910 and lived at 5027 Louise Drive, La Canada, California. She married Emerson Clyde Gates (1866-1938) and had two daughter, Maude Hill Gates and Dorothy Gates (married Charles Frederick Foster).

She died in June 1944, and is buried at Mount Washington Cemetery, Independence, Missouri.
