= Ebell Society =

- Named after: Adrian John Ebell
- Predecessor: International Academy for the Advancement of Women
- Formation: 1876
- Founded at: Oakland, California
- Type: Woman's club

The Ebell Society was a woman's club with its first chapter in Oakland, California. It was founded in 1876 and was originally called the International Academy for the Advancement of Women. The club's purpose was the advancement of women in cultural, industrial and intellectual pursuits.

After feminist Adrian John Ebell's early death in 1877 at age 37 the International Academy for the Advancement of Women renamed their club to honor him. Other chapters formed in California.

From 1907 to 1959 the Oakland chapter had a club house built in the Tudor Revival style located at 1440 Harrison Street. That building was destroyed by fire in 1959.

The original Oakland chapter disbanded in 2011.

== Gallery ==
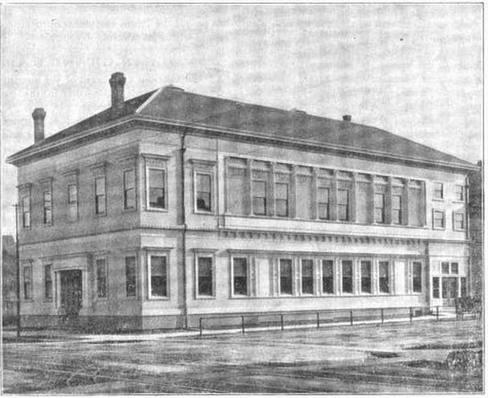
Ebell Society original 1896 Club House Oakland, California

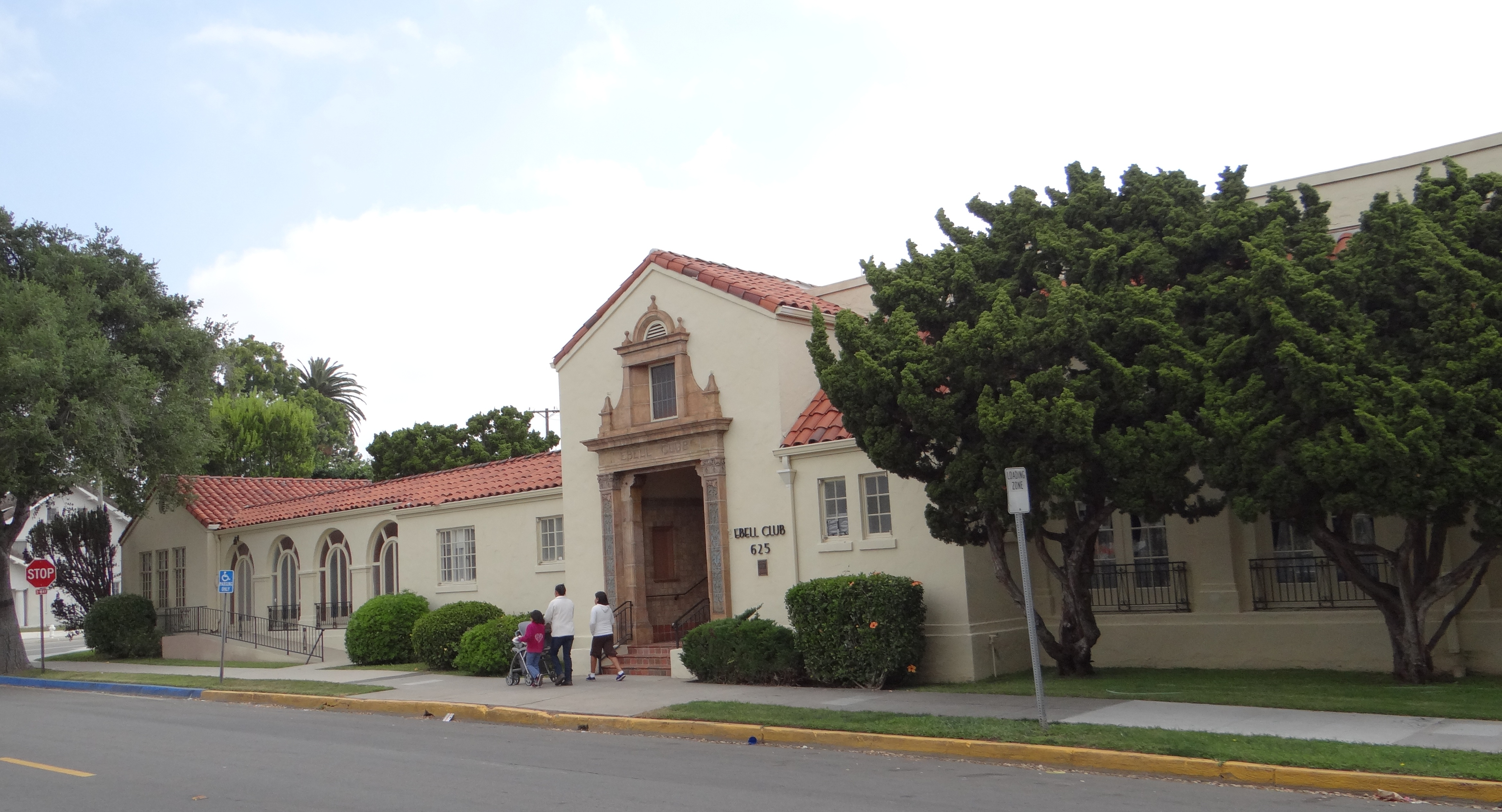
Ebell Society of Santa Ana, California

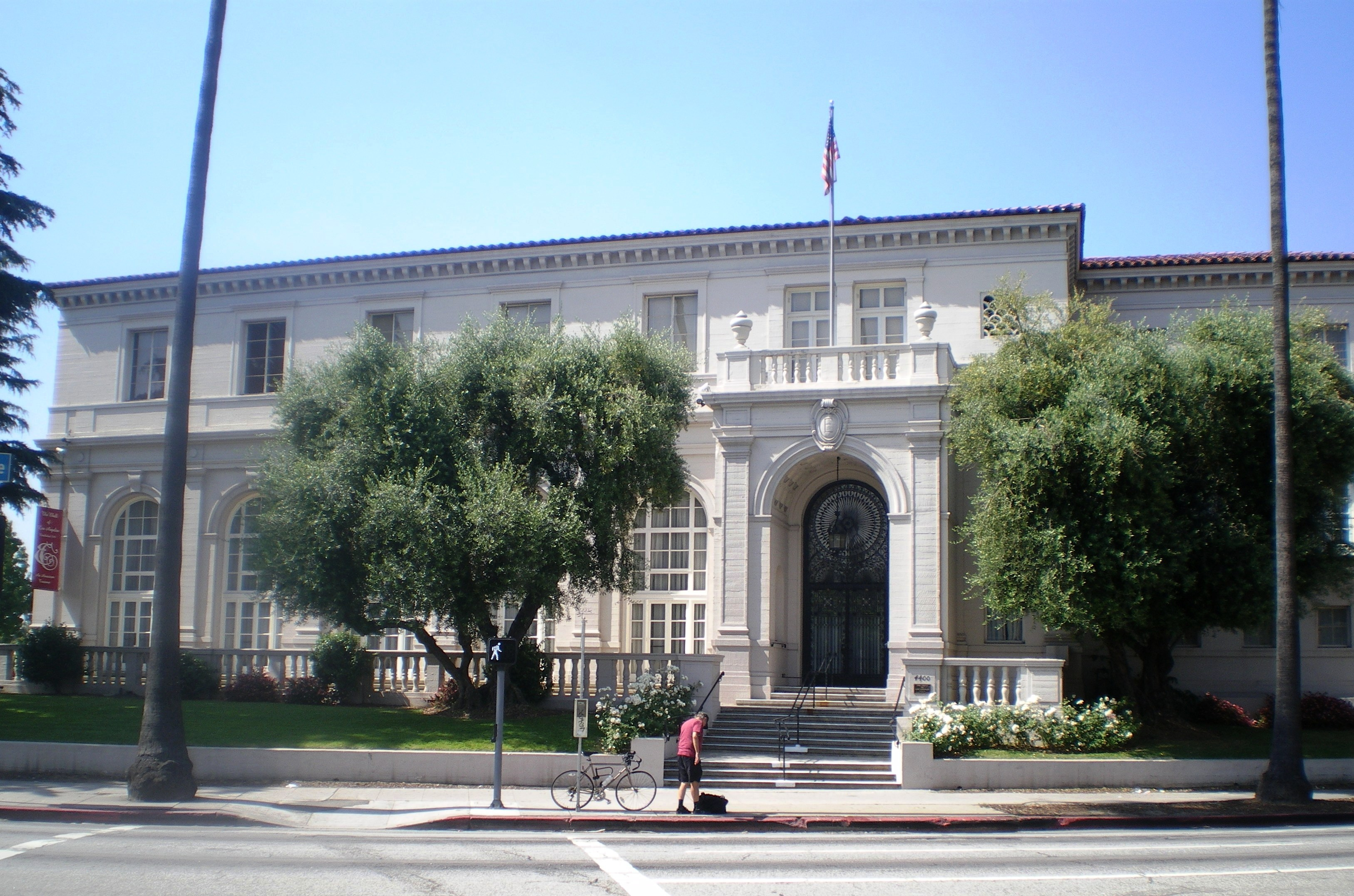
Ebell of Los Angeles, California

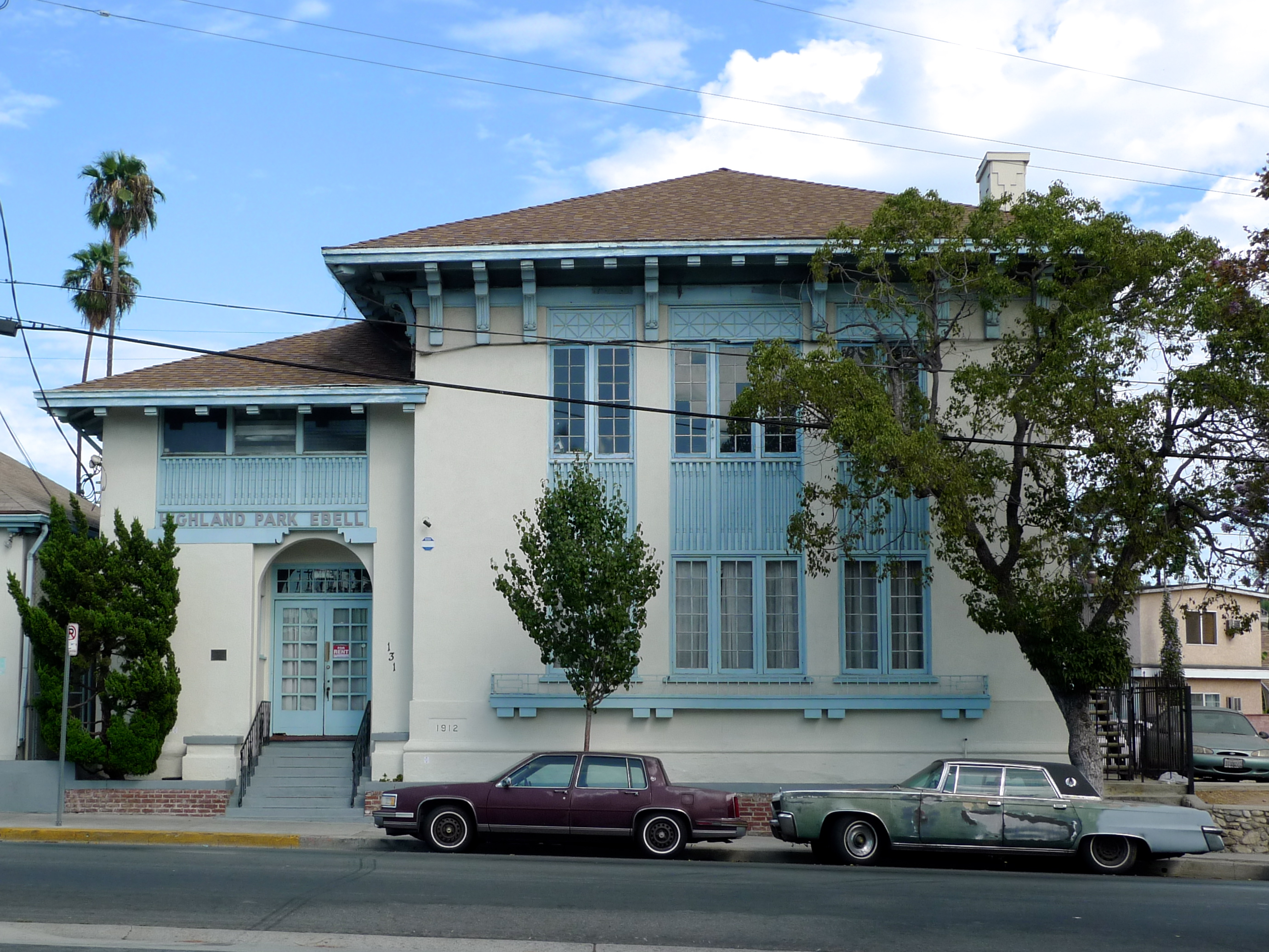
Ebell Building Highland Park, California

== See also ==
- Ebell Club of Santa Paula, California
- Ebell of Los Angeles, California
- Ebell of Long Beach, California
