= Mabel D. Mullin =

American clubwoman

Mabel Driver Mullin (born September 1, 1882) was the president of the Cosmos Club, a social club in Washington D.C.

== Early life ==
Mullin was born September 1, 1882, in Racine, Wisconsin, the daughter of Sinclair M. and Ida Driver.

== Career ==
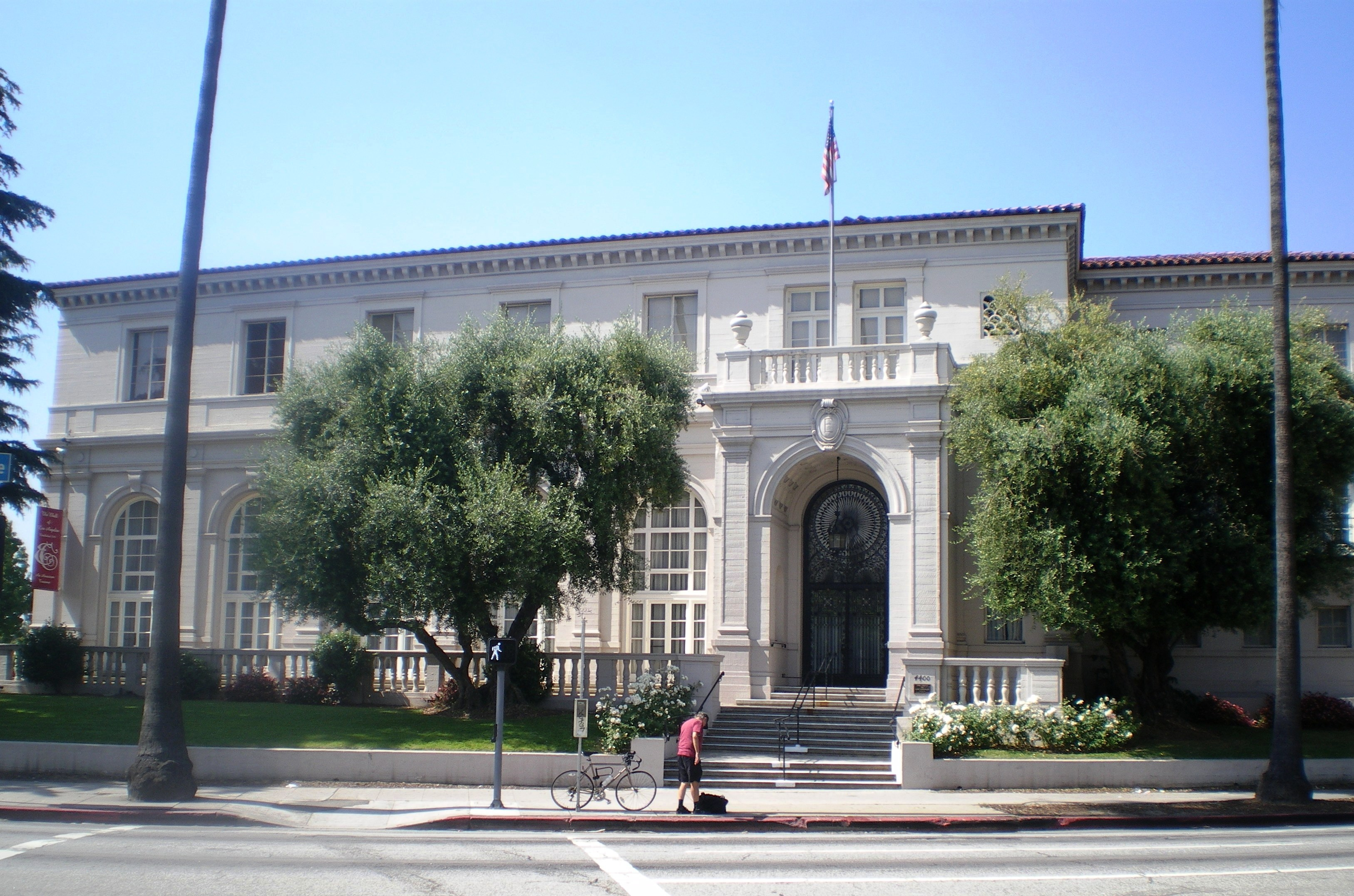
Ebell of Los Angeles

She was a very active club woman and interested in all civic affairs.

She was a president of Cosmos Club and secretary of the Presidents Association.

She was a member of Ebell of Los Angeles, Council of International Relations, Southern California Athletic and Country Club, Surf and Sand Club.

== Personal life ==
Mullin moved to California in 1903 and lived at 3846 Wilshire Blvd., Los Angeles, California. In 1925 she married Horace H. Mullin and had two children, Sinclair Allen Greer and Geraldine Greer.
