= Ida I. Bellows =

President of Ebell (Los Angeles)

Ida Isabel Perry Bellows (August 12, 1859 - January 10, 1952) was a clubwoman, the president of Ebell of Los Angeles.

== Early life ==
Ida Isabel Perry was born on August 12, 1859, in Geneva, Wisconsin, the daughter of Olney R. Perry and Susannah Fellows.

== Career ==
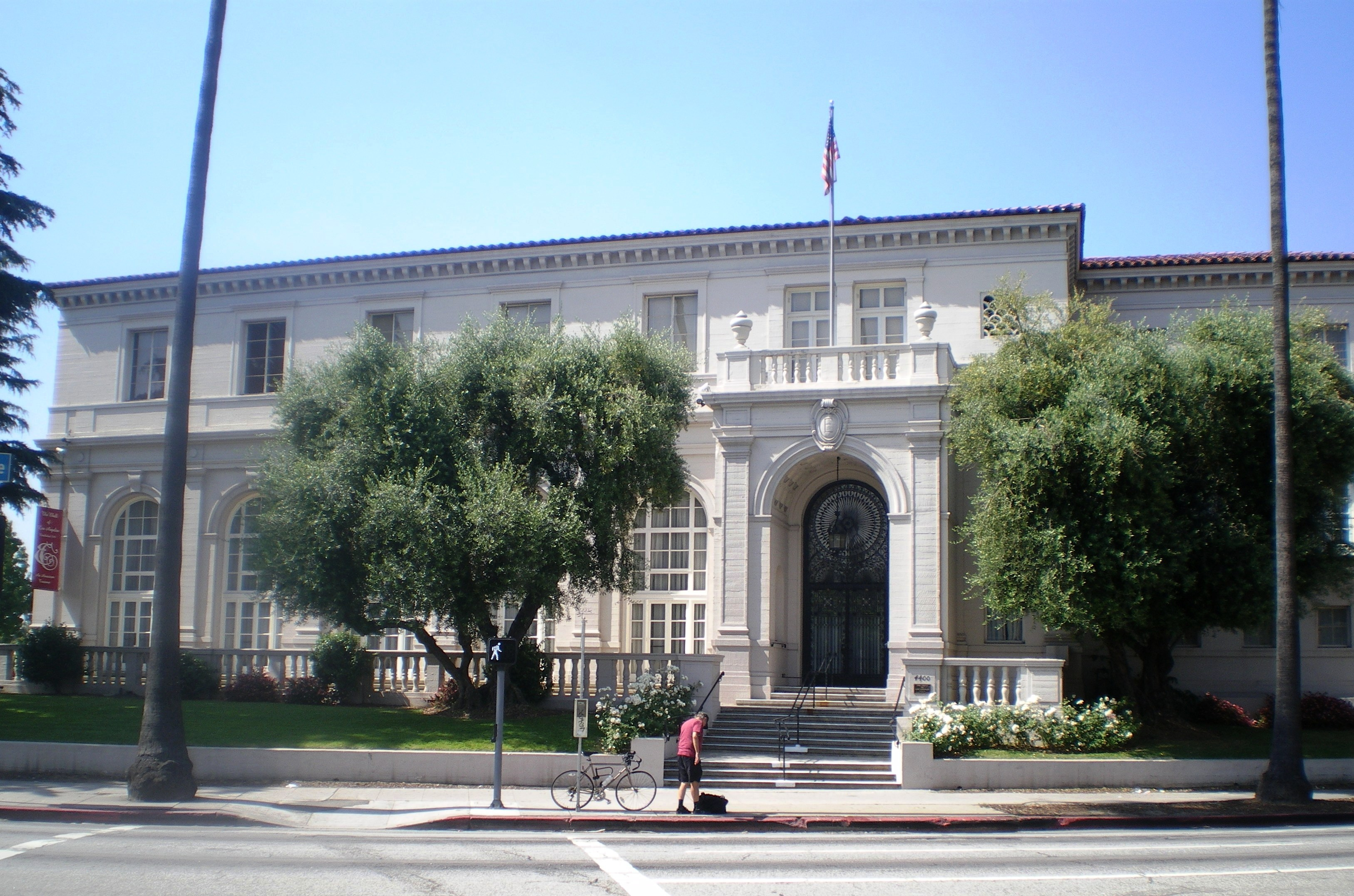
Ebell of Los Angeles

Bellows was the president of Ebell of Los Angeles from 1910 to 1912. She was president of the Woman's City Club from 1913 to 1914 and again from 1924 to 1925.

She was a member of the City Housing Commission from 1918 to 1922. In 1923, she was a member of the Board of Freeholders, which drafted the Charter. In 1926, she was a member of the Budget Committee of the Community Chest.

== Publications ==
She wrote the biography of her husband, Memoir of General E.C. Bellows, who served for many years in the consular service in Japan.

== Personal life ==
Bellows moved to California in 1905 and lived at 1422 S. Gramercy Place, Los Angeles, California.

She married General Edward Clark Bellows (1856-1929).

She died on January 10, 1952, and is buried at Forest Lawn Memorial Park (Glendale). Her will identified Matsu Matsumoto as her companion, the care she gave to Bellows "such as would be expected only from a devoted loving daughter". Matsumoto received part of the estate, personal belongings, and articles of artistic value.

== Legacy ==
The principal beneficiaries of the US$100,000 estate of Ida I. Bellows ($911,064.15 in 2017) were disabled children. Three disabled children's organizations (The Casa Colina Convalescent Home for Crippled Children, the Children's Hospital Society of Los Angeles and the Crippled Children's Society of Los Angeles County) and Berea College, Kentucky, received the residue of the estate after payment of $10,000 to her companion, Matsu Matsumoto.
