= Pearl Jane Pearson Brison =

Pearl Jane Pearson Brison was a contralto and teacher of singing on the Board of the Long Beach Symphony Orchestra. She was also an organizer and leader of women's clubs.

== Early life ==
Pearl Jane Pearson was born on December 1, 1881, in Florida, the daughter of John W. Pearson and Sarah Mattingly.

== Career ==
Pearl Brison was a teacher of singing. She served on the board of the Long Beach Symphony Orchestra. For five years she was the Choir Director of the Atlantic Avenue Methodist Episcopal Church.

She served as president of Woman's City Club and Ebell of Long Beach. Ebell of Long Beach, one of the largest women's clubs in Southern California, was organized November 16, 1896, with seventeen charter members. The Ebell of the 1920s had well over one thousand member and twenty departments. Brison was vice-president of the Camp Fire Girls, a local organization. She was one of the committee of fifteen citizens to help vote bonds for extensive City and Harbor progress. She organized the Dr. Margaret Clark Circle, a children's welfare group. She helped organize the North Long Beach Women's Club.

In 1950 she endorsed Herbert R. Klocksiem, for the California's 71st State Assembly district.

She was a member of the Woman's Music Club, the Opera Reading Club, the College Woman's Club.

== Personal life ==
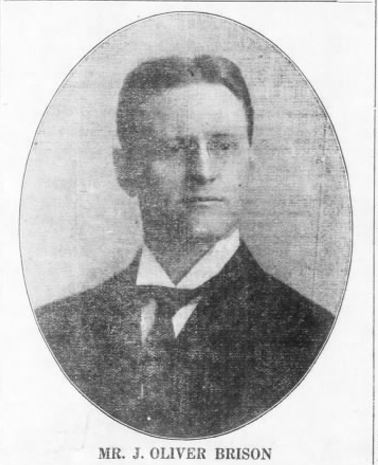
John Oliver Brison

While living in Kansas City, on June 18, 1914, Pearl Pearson married John Oliver Brison (188–1964), a well known chorus leader and tenor. The couple often performed together, especially in events for the Methodist Episcopal Church.

Beginning of 1919, together with her husband, Brison moved to Charleston, South Carolina, where she was engaged by the War Camp Community Service. In Autumn of 1919 they moved to New York.

Pearl Brison then moved first to Washington, D.C., and then to Long Beach, California, in 1922. J. Olver Brison was city clerk from 1927 to 1936. She lived at 1888 Gaviota Avenue and 821 Chestnut Avenue, Long Beach, California.

She died on February 25, 1962.

After the death of his wife, J. Oliver Brison moved to Desert Hot Springs, California, to stay near his brothers.
