= Ebell of Los Angeles =

- U.S. National Register of Historic Places
- Los Angeles Historic-Cultural Monument
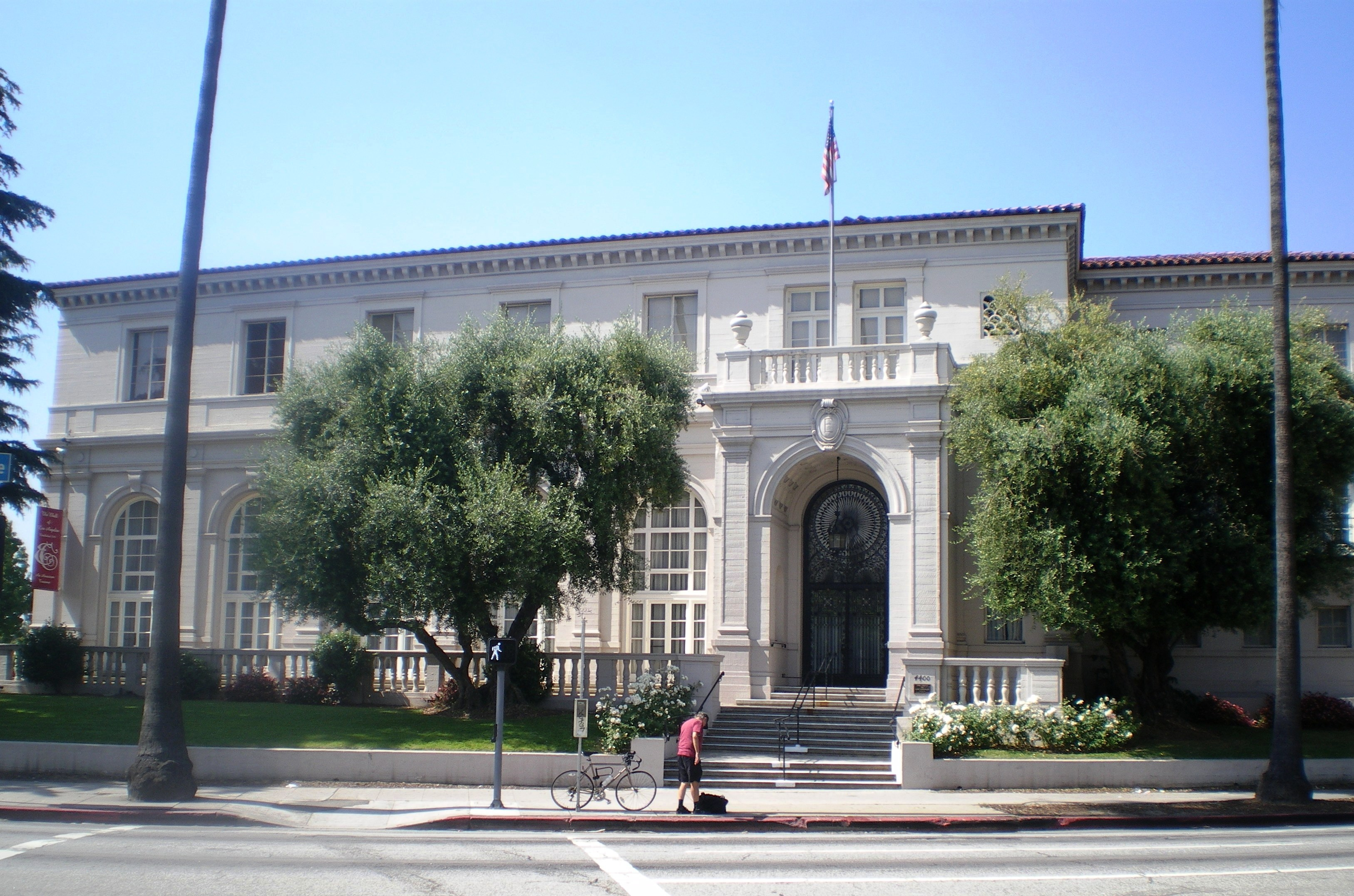
- Ebell of Los Angeles, Wilshire frontage
- Location: 743 S. Lucerne Boulevard, Los Angeles, California
- Coordinates: 34°3′42″N 118°19′27″W
- Built: 1927
- Architect: Hunt, Sumner P.; Schofield Engineering & Construction
- Architectural style: Italian Renaissance
- NRHP reference No.: 94000401
- LAHCM No.: 250

Significant dates
- Added to NRHP: May 6, 1994
- Designated LAHCM: 1982-08-25

The Ebell of Los Angeles is a women-led and women-centered nonprofit housed in a historic campus in the Mid-Wilshire section of Los Angeles, California. It includes numerous performance spaces, meeting rooms, classrooms, and the 1,238-seat Wilshire Ebell Theatre. The Ebell works to uplift the Los Angeles community through arts, learning, and service.

The campus has been owned and operated since 1927 by the Ebell of Los Angeles women's organization, which was formed in Los Angeles in 1894. Since 1927, the Wilshire Ebell Theatre has hosted musical performances and lectures by world leaders and top artists. Among other events, the Ebell was the site of aviator Amelia Earhart's last public appearance before attempting the 1937 around-the-world flight during which she disappeared. It is also the place where Judy Garland was discovered while performing as Baby Frances Gumm in the 1930s.

== Formation and early years ==
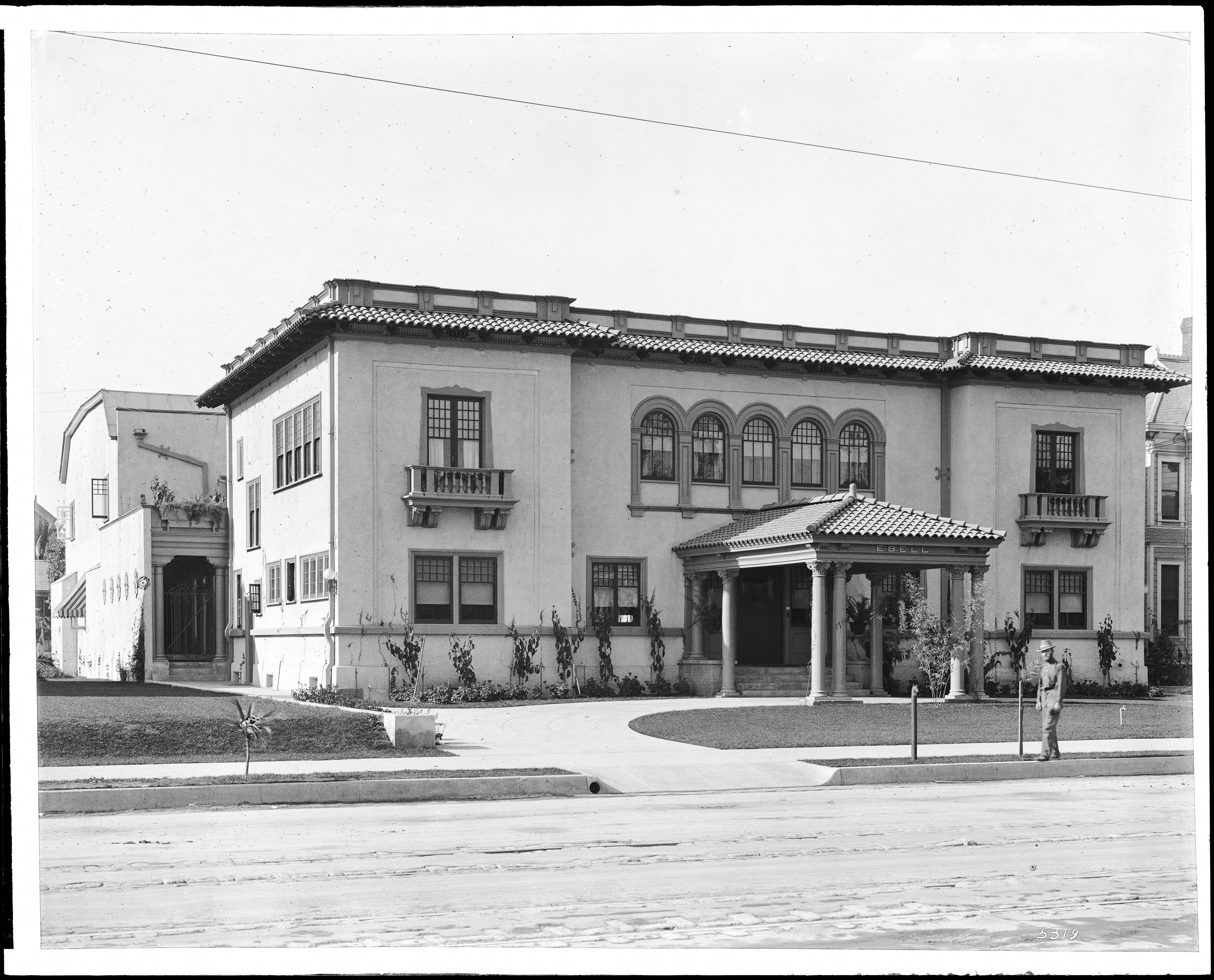
Original Ebell Club, on Figueroa Street in Downtown L.A.

Ebell of Los Angeles was formed as a women's club in 1894, based on the principles and teachings of Adrian Ebell, a pioneer in women's education and organizing women's societies in the late 19th century. Harriet Williams Russell Strong was a founder of the club, serving as its president for three consecutive terms. The minutes of the first meeting of Ebell of Los Angeles identified its purpose "to interest women in the study of all branches of literature, art and science and the advancement of women in every branch of culture." The club adopted as its motto, "I will find a way or make one -- I serve."

Over the years, the group has conducted classes, and hosted lectures and seminars, on topics including psychology, parliamentary law, travel, literature, music, gardening, and science. Even before moving to its current quarters, it actively promoted the arts, as when from May 23 to July 25, 1919, it sponsored a marathon ten-week series of chamber music recitals by the Zoellner Quartet.

== New building on Wilshire Boulevard ==
In 1923, the group announced plans to build a new clubhouse and theater west of downtown on Wilshire Boulevard. Before construction began, the lot at Wilshire Boulevard and Shatto Place had appreciated and was sold for a profit; a new lot at the corner of Wilshire Boulevard and Lucerne was purchased in 1925.

The group commissioned architect Sumner P. Hunt of Hunt & Burns to design the new facility, which was designed in an Italian style with plaster facing and Italian clay tile roofing. The new facilities consisted of multiple structures covering a site 160 by 450 feet (49 m × 137 m), surrounding a 65-by-120-foot (20 m × 37 m) patio area. The new facilities included a new 1,300-seat auditorium at the rear of the property facing 8th Street. The two-story structure facing Wilshire Boulevard houses the group's clubhouse, including a large lounge, art salon, and dining room. The dining room opens to a tile-roofed colonnade walkway and fountain.

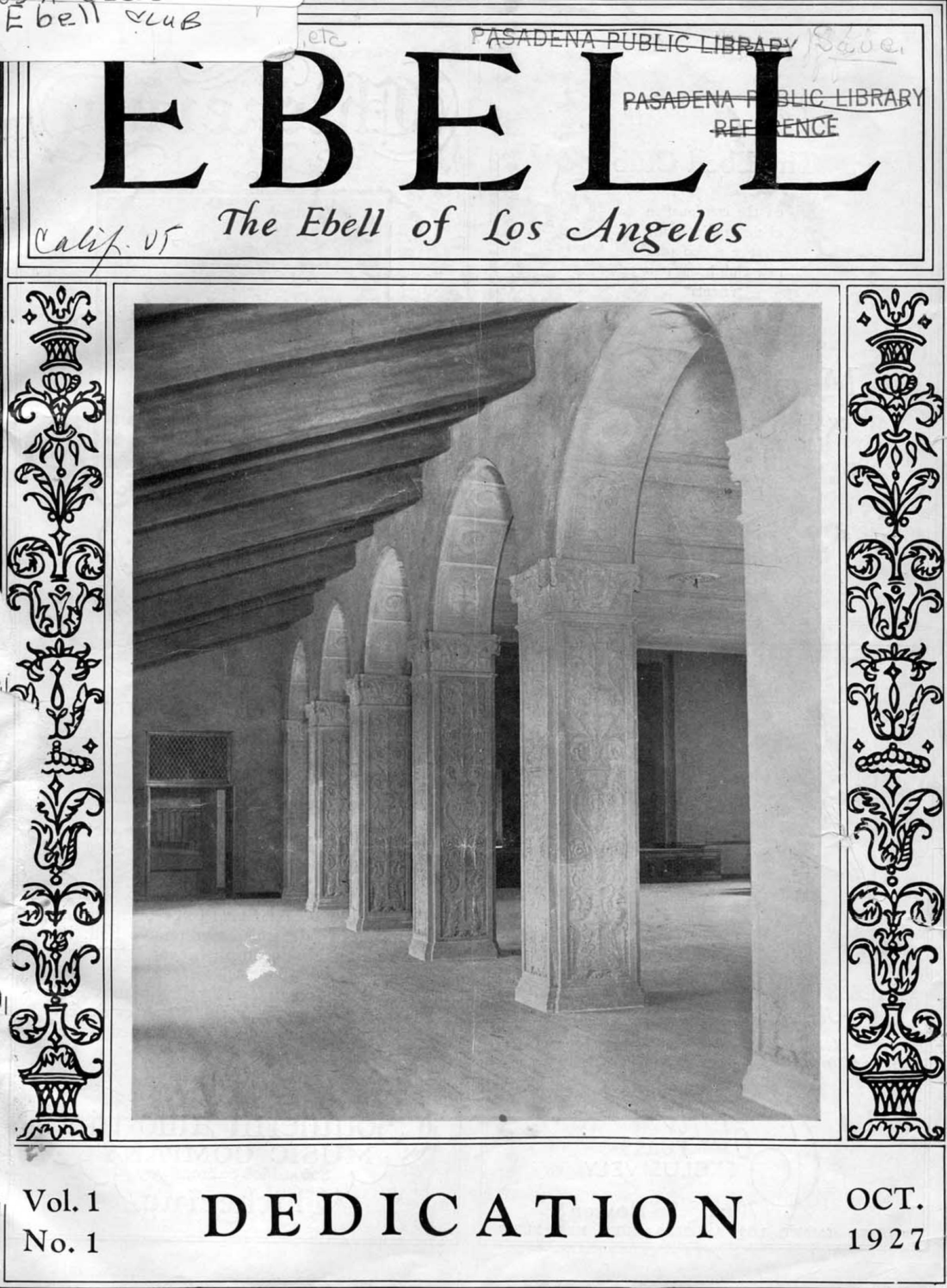
Ebell magazine from 1927 shows the new tile-roofed colonnade walkway.

The clubhouse opened with a musicale tea in October 1927, and the Wilshire Ebell Theater, originally known as the Windsor Square Playhouse, opened to the public in December 1927 with the west coast premiere of Sigmund Romberg's musical The Desert Song. When the buildings opened, the group's president wrote in the club's newsletter:

The result of their tireless and unceasing labor may be seen at 4400 Wilshire Boulevard where a stately group of buildings now adorns a sightly eminence. The separated units have been so carefully designed as to form a magnificent mass, a colossal edifice, severely simple, classically correct, pleasing in its very ruggedness, elegant in its ornate adornment, suited to the purpose for which it was built.

The total cost was $200,000 for the site, $650,000 for the entire structure, and $120,000 for the furnishings. Another writer observed: "Nowhere in America is there a more magnificent women's club house than the new home of Ebell. ... Every modern convenience and appliance, together with furnishings of the finest quality, are within its walls. It is lavish, but not flamboyantly so. It is practical and it has beauty and inspiring charm."

The 1,300-seat theater is known for its acoustics and its Barton pipe organ. The Los Angeles Times in 2003 described the theater as "the grande dame of genteel grace," "a cultural centerpiece for Los Angeles," and "one of the area's most striking" auditoriums.

== The four Sibyl frescoes ==
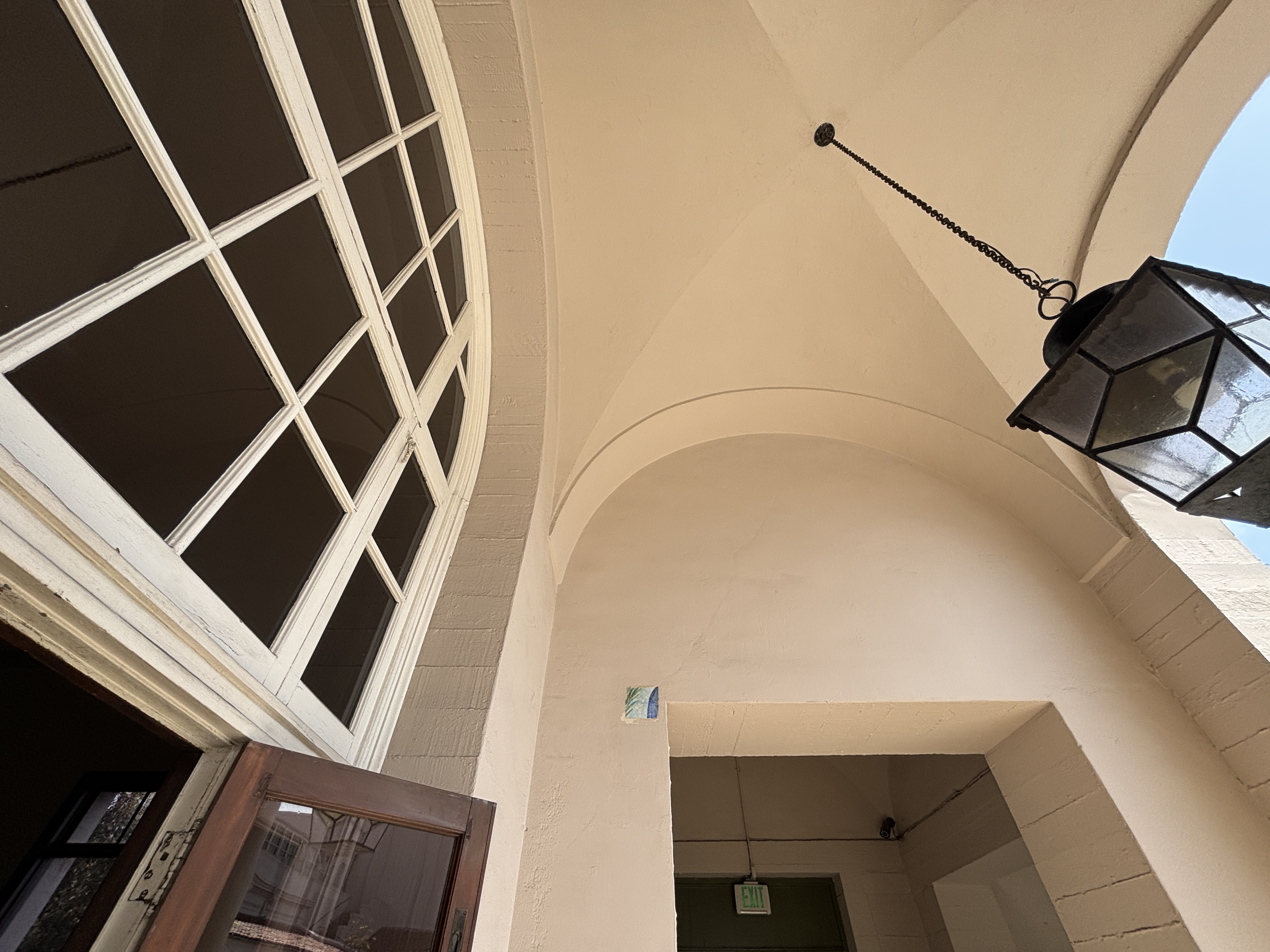
Fragment of the Maxine Albro frescoes at Ebell of Los Angeles, revealed during restoration (2025)

Maxine Albro painted The Four Sibyls on the walls of the central courtyard of the Ebell of Los Angeles in the 1930's. The "Portly Roman Sibyl" offended some of the organization's members and the frescoes were painted over in 1935. That year, several prominent art critics, rose to her defense, including the young Arthur Millier: "Personally I think they are beautiful decorations which deserve to live and which will be missed."

The San Francisco News of May 25, 1935, printed the following: "Speaking of murals, Maxine Albro moved right up in line with Diego Rivera, David Siqueiros, and Clifford Wight (Clifford Seymour Weight, 1891—1961) last month, when the Ebell Club of Los Angeles, after two years of internal squabbling, finally destroyed frescoes of the four Sibyls which Miss Albro had painted in the loggia of its more or less Italian Club House."

In early 2025, portions of the frescoes were uncovered.

== Notable performances ==
In more than eighty years of productions, the Wilshire Ebell has witnessed performances by many stars and celebrities. Some marked the historical record:

- Young Judy Garland, then known as Baby Frances Gumm, first auditioned on the Wilshire Ebell Theater stage, and was discovered while performing there. MGM producer George Sidney later described Garland's first audition this way: "I had made Judy's first screen test. There was a theater here in Los Angeles called the Wilshire-Ebell. ... [T]hey used to put on vaudeville acts on certain nights of the week. This little girl came out with her two sisters and her mother playing the piano. She did a little number with a baseball bat. We took her out to the studio and made a test on a soundstage..." And in his biography of Garland, Gerold Frank described an early performance on the Wilshire Ebell stage, witnessed by another MGM producer, Joseph L. Mankiewicz: "Judy sang. And in his seat, Joe Mankiewicz, who was to win half a dozen Oscars as a screenwriter and director, underwent a memorable experience. He sat transfixed. Not only the power, but something electric ..." Mankewicz met the 13-year-old Garland backstage at the Ebell and determined to bring her name to the studio's attention.
- In 1937, Amelia Earhart made her last public appearance and speech at the Ebell before leaving for her ill-fated around-the-world flight.
- On February 2, 1938, Korean dancer Choi Seung-hee performed a costumed "recital of peasant, court and war dances" on the Ebell stage as part of a United States tour which included the Guild Theatre in New York City.
- In late 1948, Polish-born local artist Stan Poray was headlining an exhibition of paintings at the Ebell when he died during a layover in a New York City airport, returning from a lecturing and exhibiting tour in Caracas, Venezuela.
- On April 10, 1964, Glenn Gould gave his final public performance at the Ebell. Among the pieces he performed that night were Beethoven's Piano Sonata No. 30, selections from Bach's The Art of Fugue, and the Piano Sonata No. 3, Op. 92 No. 4 by Ernst Krenek. A recording exists in which Gould says the event took place in Chicago.
- Two years before his assassination, Filipino opposition leader and Ferdinand Marcos critic Benigno S. Aquino Jr. held a freedom rally speech at the theater on February 15, 1981; sharing his life and struggle under the martial law dictatorship for the jam-packed crowd of Filipino and American audience.

== Renovation and historic designation ==
A major restoration of the Ebell complex commenced in 1989. The theater's seats were re-covered, the stage refitted, and new sound and lighting systems installed. Renovation work also extended to the main dining room (also known as the Concert Hall), the Grand Salon and Lounge, the Galleria, and the Art Salon.

In recent years, the events held at the Wilshire Ebell Theater have reflected the ethnic diversity of the neighborhood, with shows staged in Persian, Korean, and Russian. It has also been the site of annual "Divas Simply Singing" benefits for AIDS, featuring singers Nancy Wilson, Roberta Flack, Rita Moreno, and Toni Tennille.

The building has been designated as a historic structure at the local, state and national levels, including the following recognition:

- The Ebell was declared a Los Angeles Cultural Historic Monument in 1982.
- It was added to the National Register of Historic Places in 1994.
- It has also been designated an Official American Treasure by the National Trust for Historic Preservation.

== Notable members ==
- Lillie Stella Acer Ballagh
- Ida I. Bellows, president from 1910 to 1912
- Pearlretta DuPuy, charter member
- Mabel Barnett Gates, first vice-president
- Betty Gilmore
- Shirlee Taylor Haizlip, appointed president in 2000 and 2010
- Mabel D. Mullin
- Dora A. Stearns

== Gallery ==
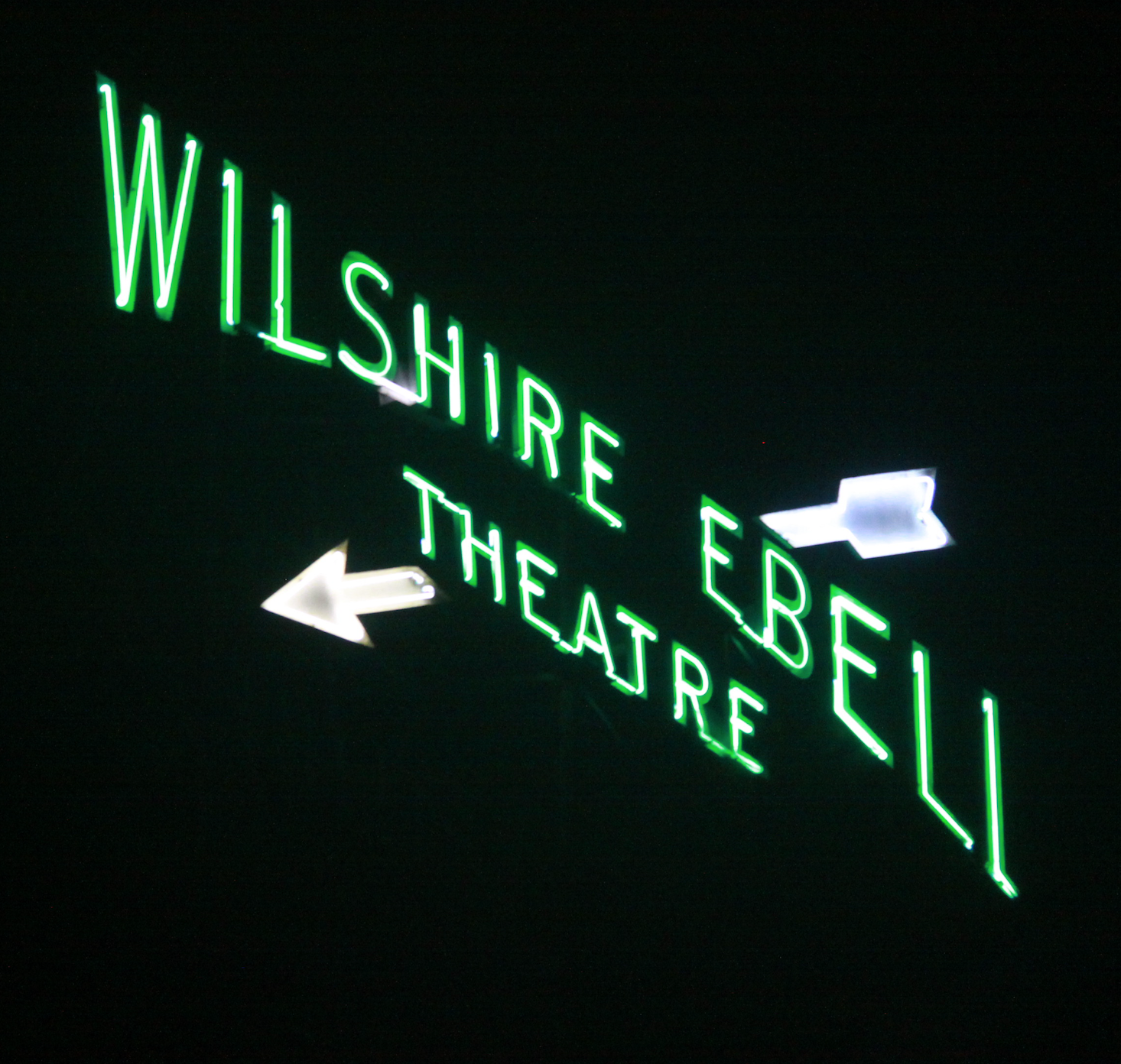
One of the Ebell's neon signs.

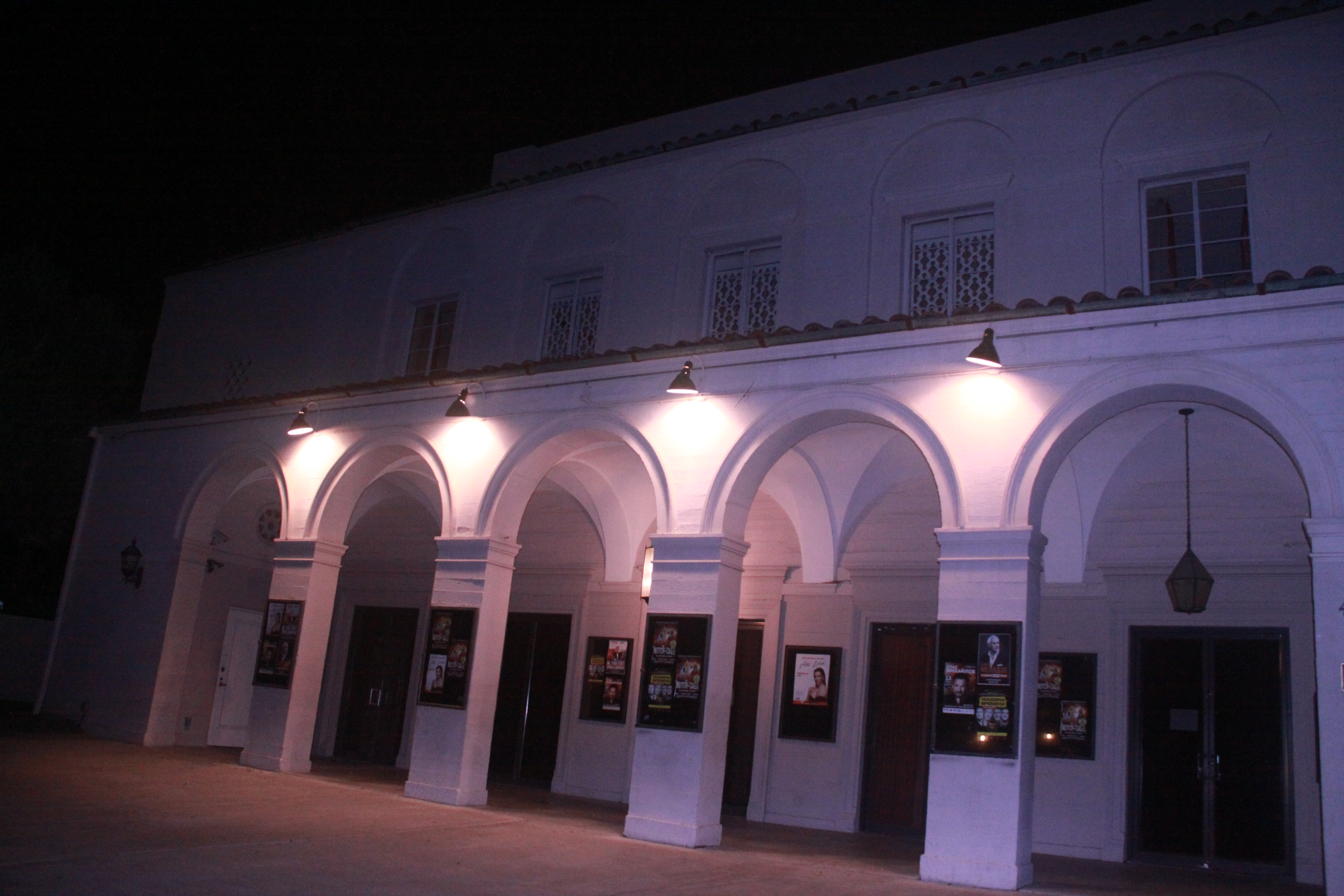
The south side of the Ebell Theatre.

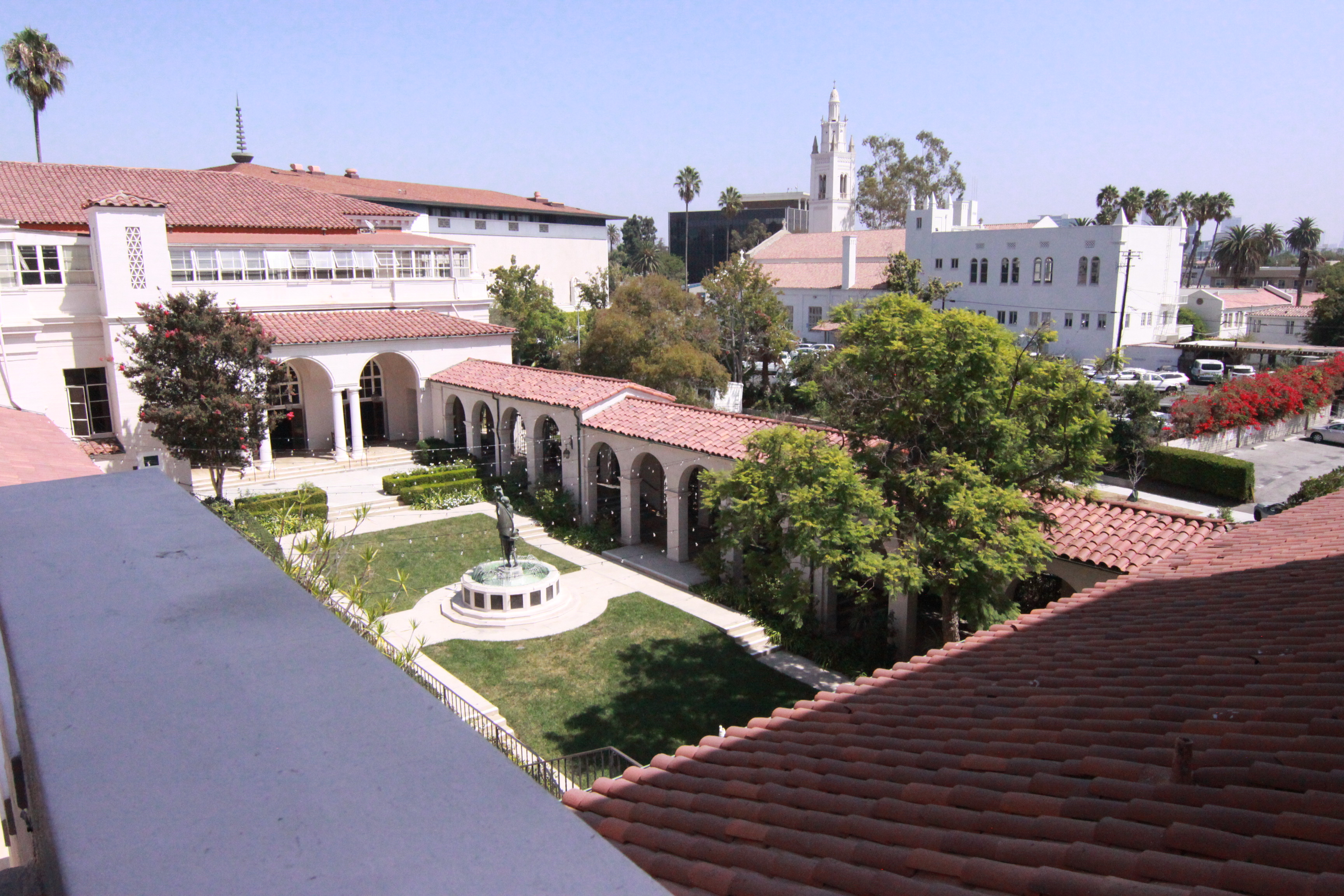
The Ebell courtyard. The building was designed by Sumner P. Hunt in a Romanesque/Mediterranean Revival style.

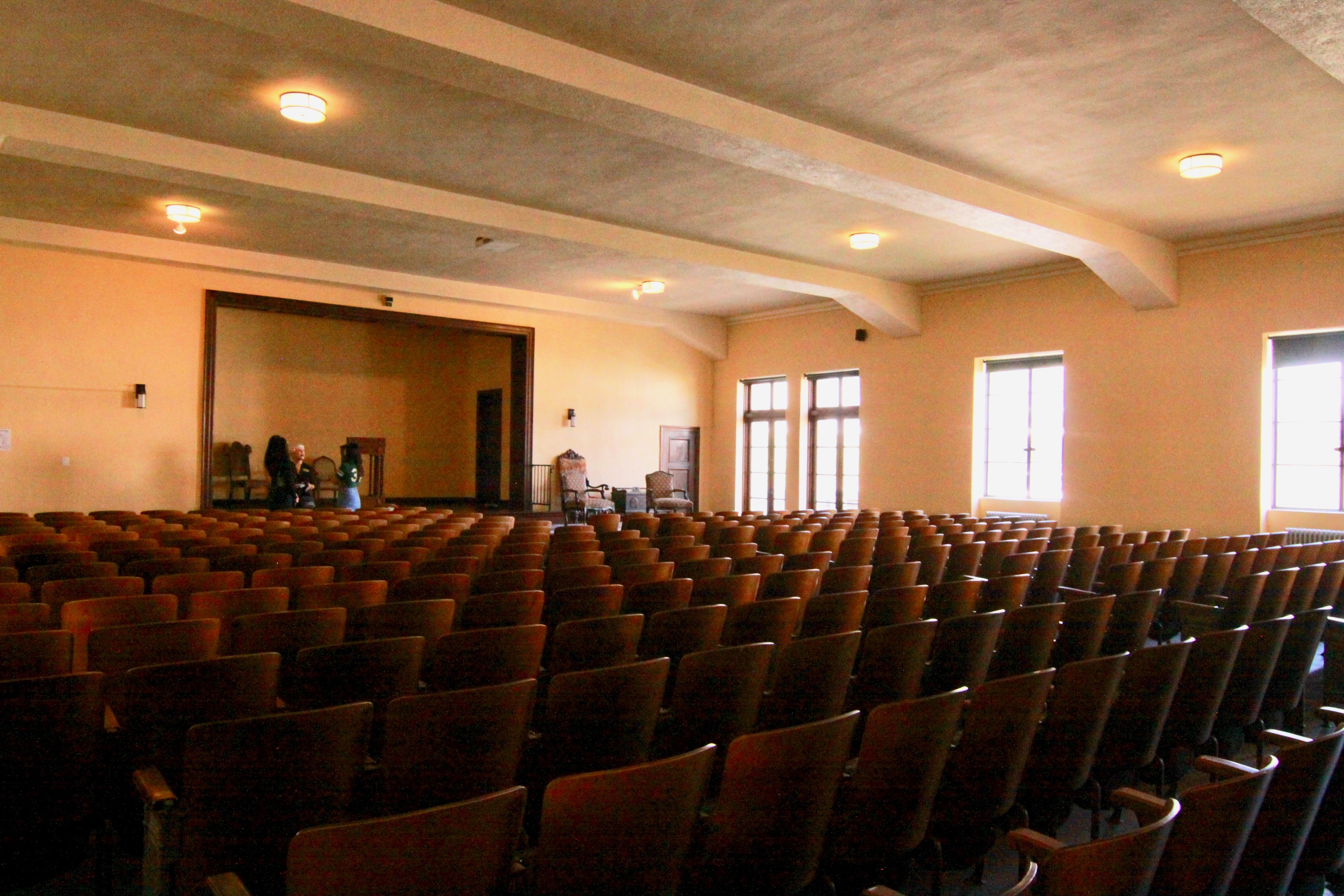
The Fine Arts Auditorium within the Ebell, where Amelia Earhart gave her last public speech.

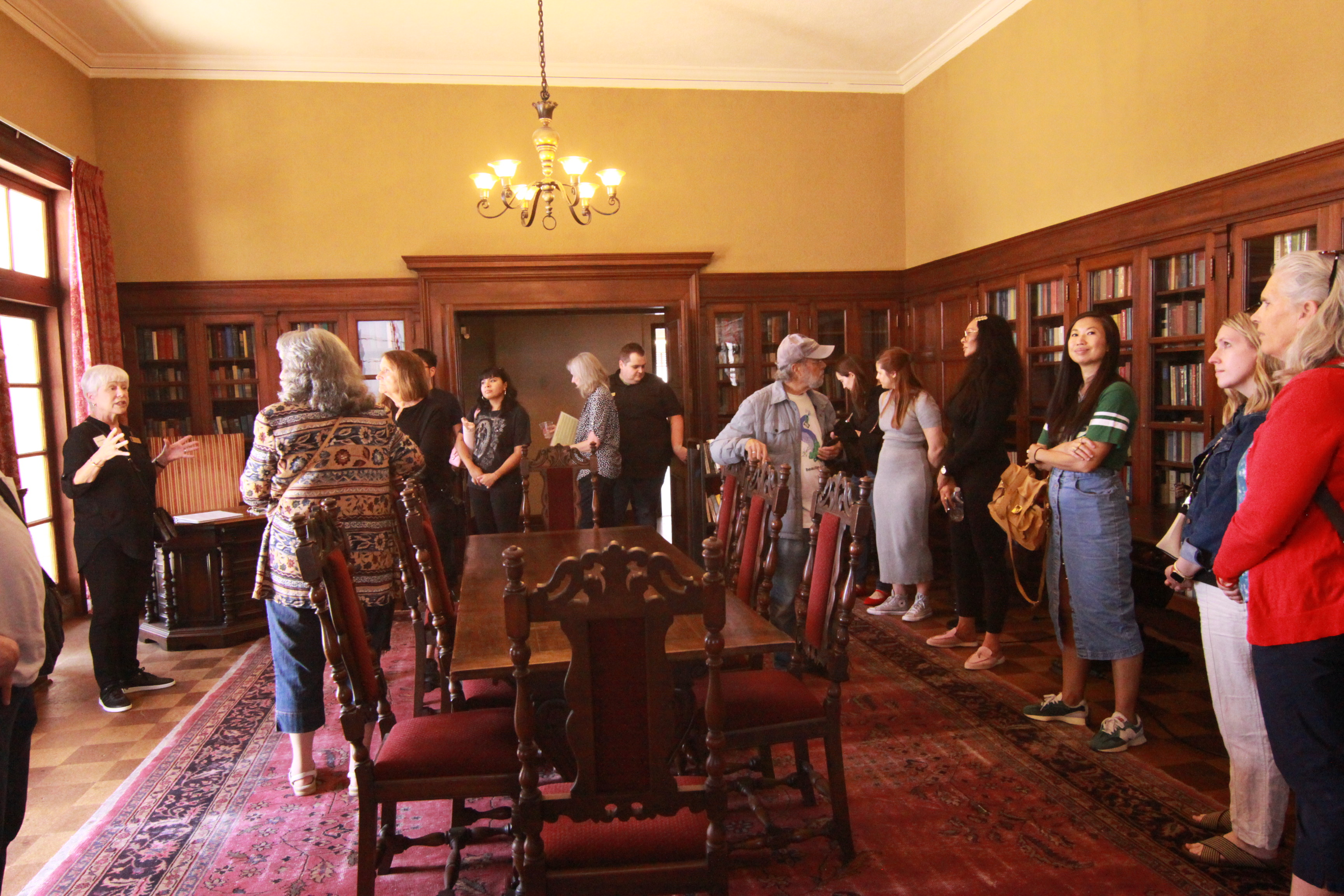
The Ebell library.

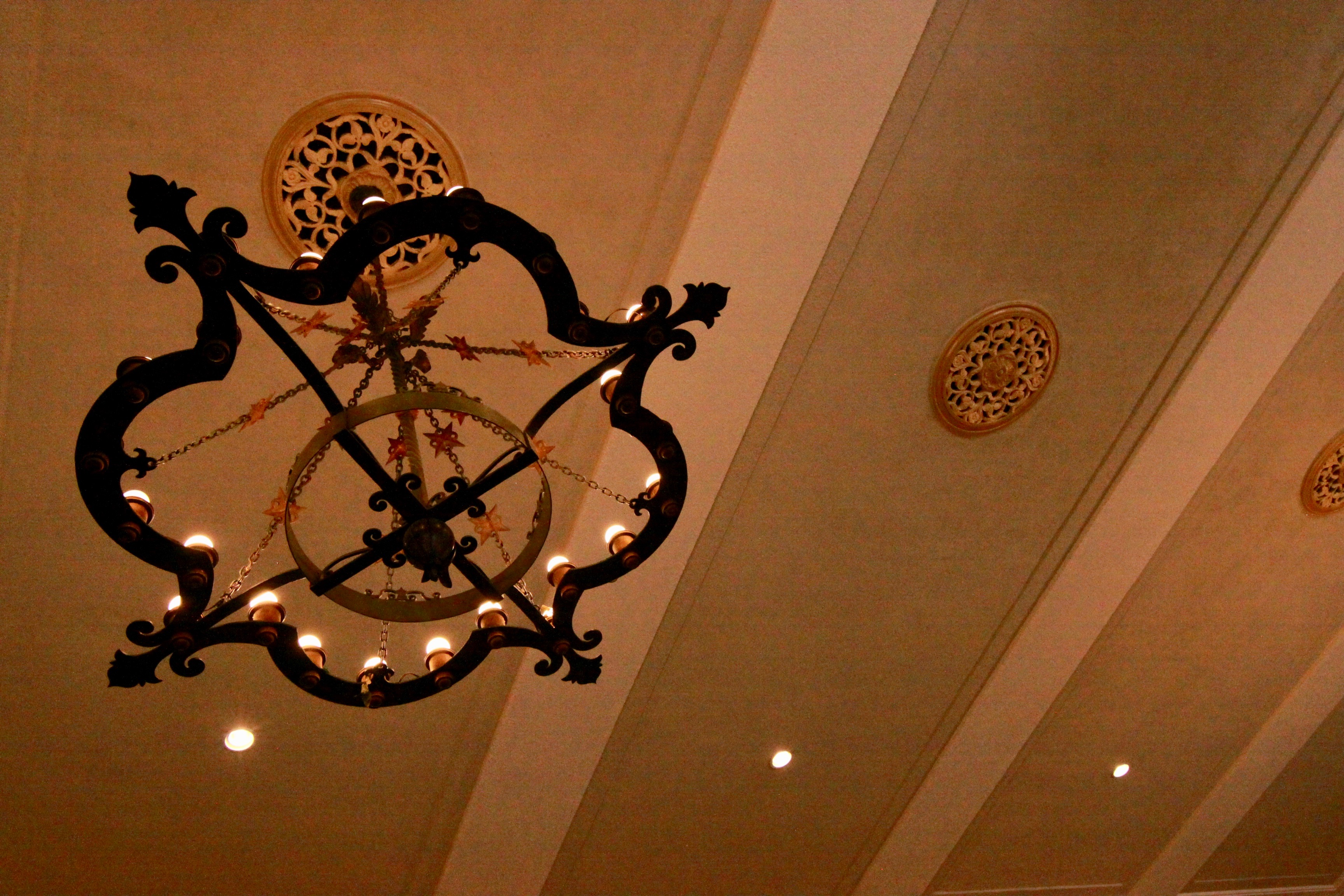
An Ebell chandelier.

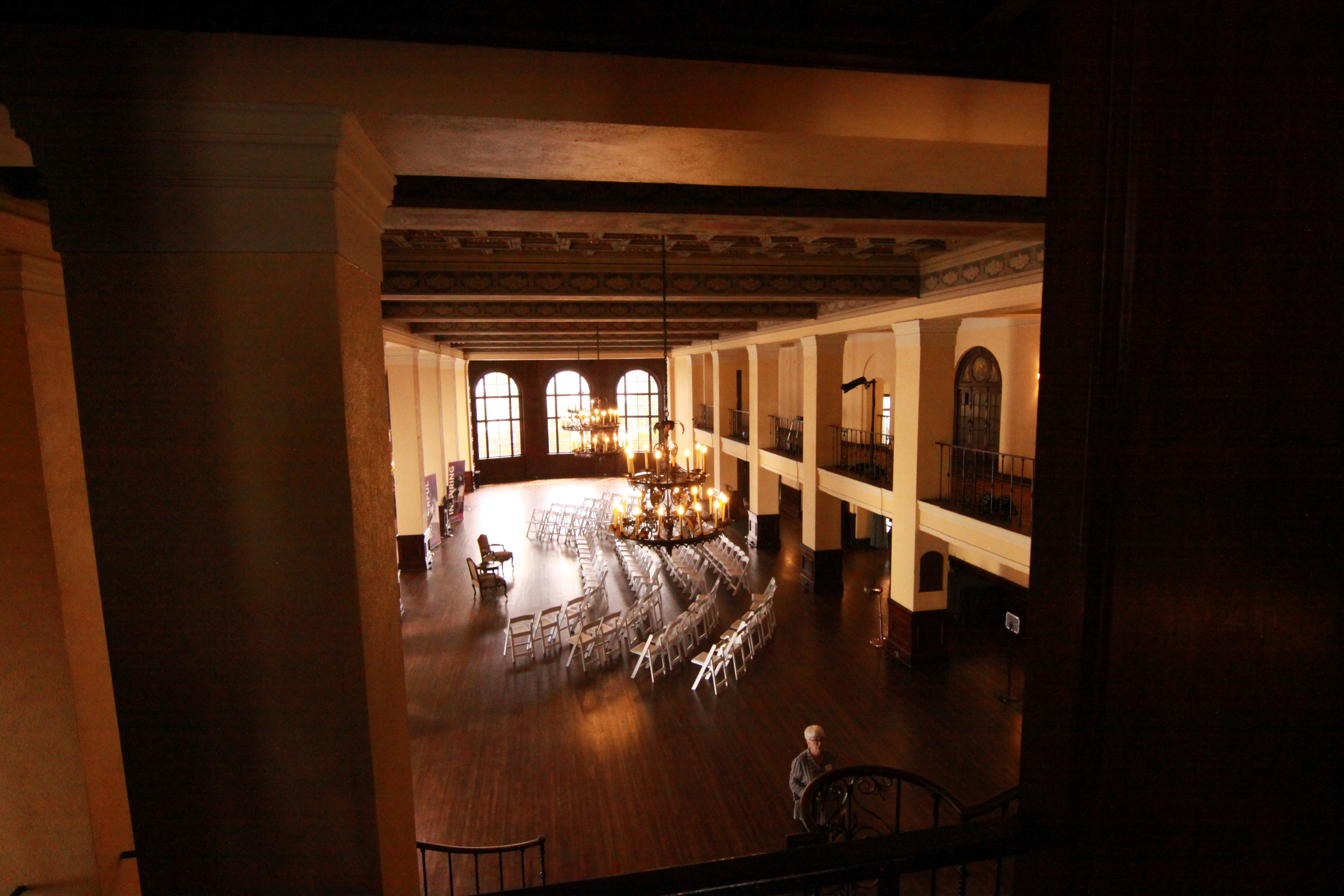
One of the main rooms of the Ebell.

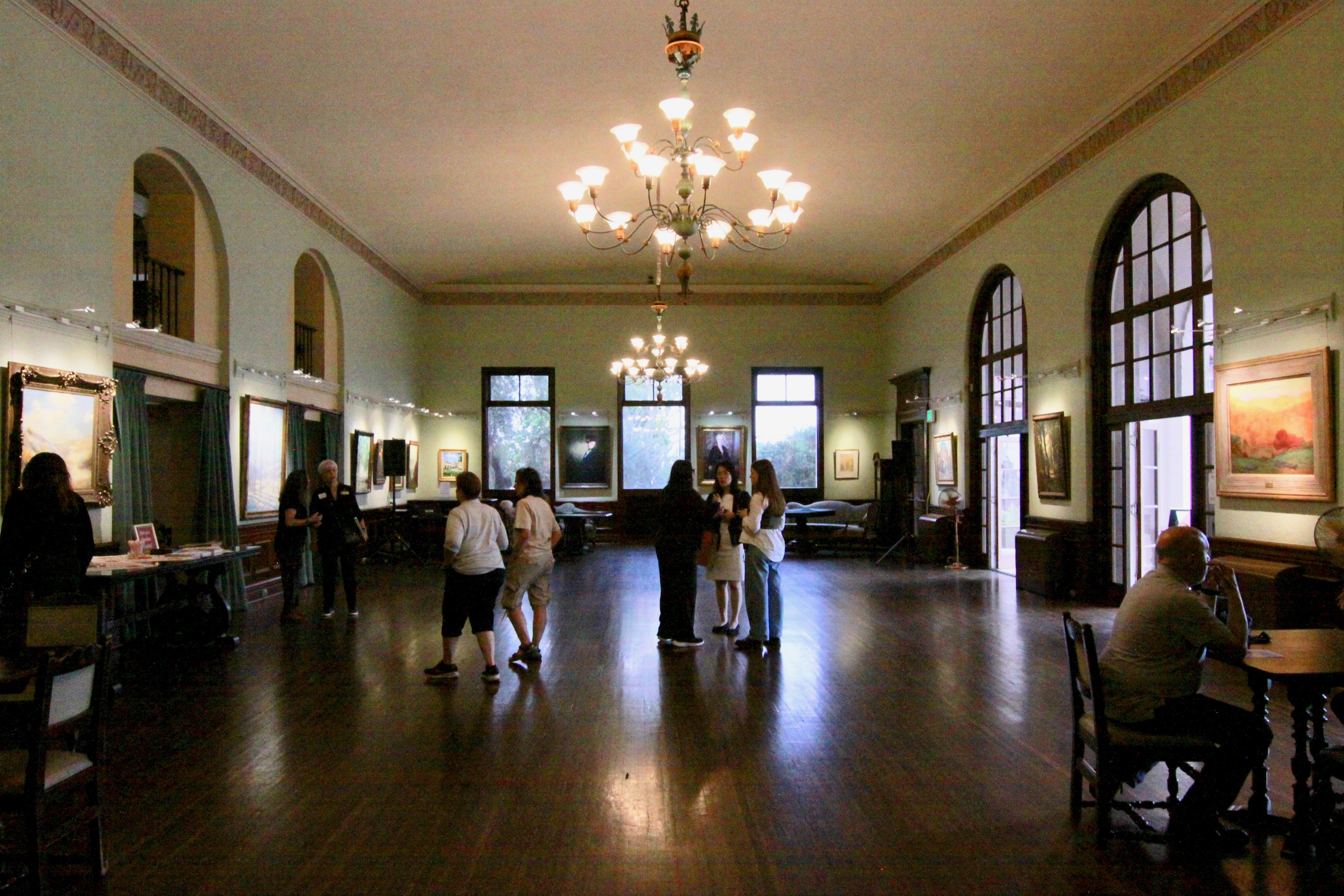
The Ebell art salon.

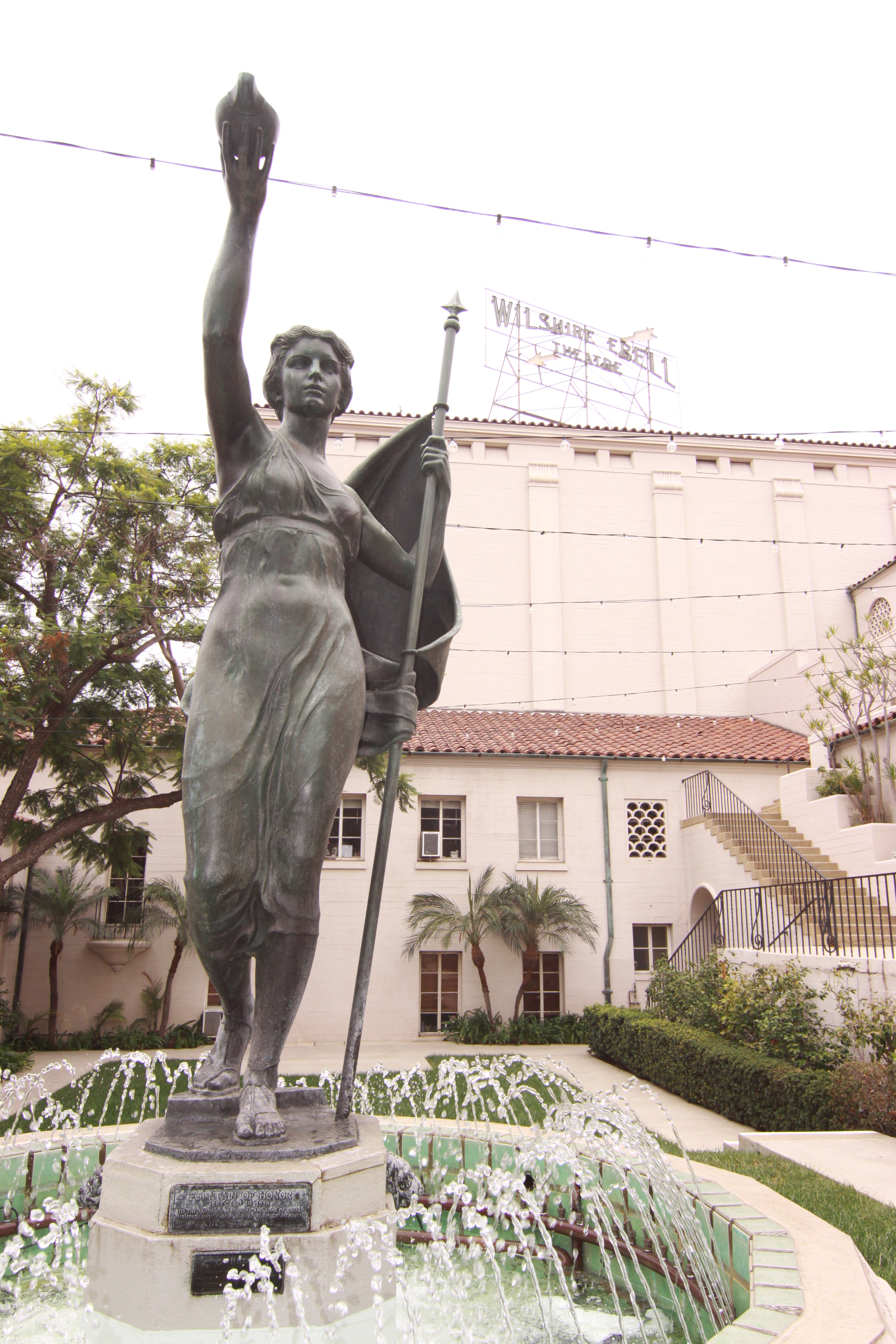
The Fountain of Honor, dating to 1930, in the Ebell courtyard. The statue is a symbol for the club and the fountain honors the club's women's male family members who lost their lives in WWI as well as some female doctors that served on the homefront during the war.

== See also ==
- Ebell Club of Santa Paula, California
- Ebell of Long Beach
- Ebell Society
- National Register of Historic Places listings in Los Angeles
- List of Los Angeles Historic-Cultural Monuments in the Wilshire and Westlake areas
