= Betty Gilmore =

Vera Aleece Elizabeth MacIndoe Gilmore who wrote under the pen-name of Betty Gilmore, was the founder and president of the California Women of Golden West.

== Early life ==
Vera Aleece Elizabeth MacIndoe was born in Binghamton, New York, the daughter of James M. Maclndoe and Margaret Claudia Quinn, old South Carolina pioneers of Scotch ancestry.

Betty Gilmore attended Ashley Hall, a boarding school for girls in Charleston, South Carolina. She then moved to Lady Jane Grey's School for Girls in New York and graduated from Binghamton High School and University of Southern California, Los Angeles.

== Career ==
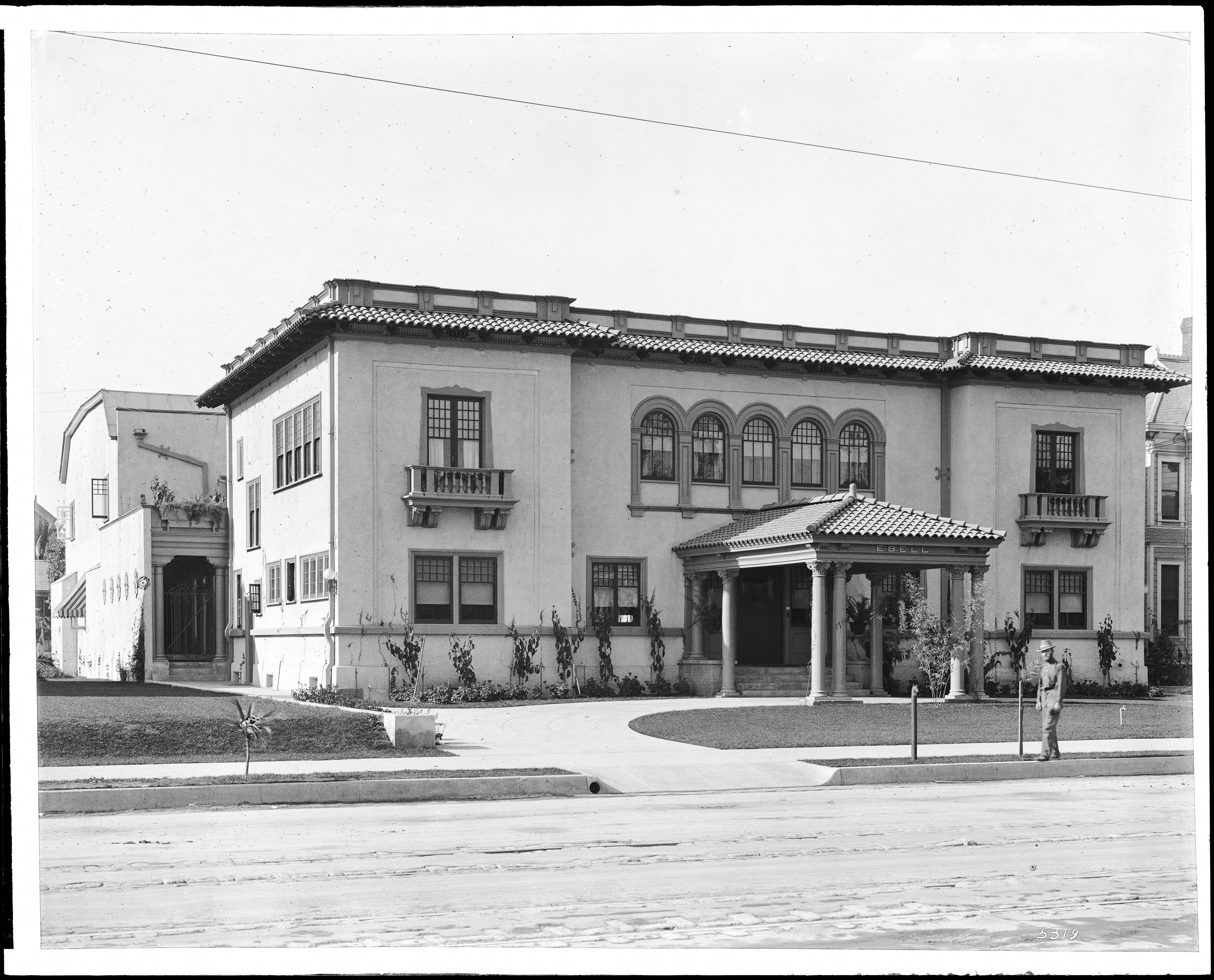
Exterior view of the Ebell Club, a two-story Spanish colonial building on Figueroa Street, ca.1900-1909 (CHS-5319)

Betty Gilmore was the editor of the Deauville Magazine and a writer of editorial, short stories, newspapers, feature material and general publicity. She was a patron of art, music and drama, herself an artist, having studied painting and sketching under the best New York, Paris and Berlin teachers and artists. She was the first vice-president of the Los Angeles Woman's City Club and a life member of the Artland Club. She was the director of the Matinee Musical Club and second vice-president of the Scribbler's League. She was press chairman of the Southern California Woman's Press Club and chairman of the 4th District Auxiliary Los Angeles Chamber of Commerce and of the Women Commission of the Wilshire Chamber of Commerce. In 1929 she founded the California Women of Golden West, and was its president emeritus. According to the prime motive of the club, California women of achievement were to be honored each month with a social event. In the first 10 years from its founding, the club complimented more than 200 women of achievement. She also founded the Gilmore Los Angeles Evening Salon. She was the president of The New Deal Club. She was a member of: Ebell of Los Angeles Club, Opera and Fine Arts Club, Euterpe Opera Club, Republican Study Club, League of Women Voters, Big Sister's League, Deauville Beach Club, Los Angeles Presidents' Civic Club, American Women Club, Women's Breakfast Club, Pacific Geographical Club, National Constitutional Organization.

== Personal life ==
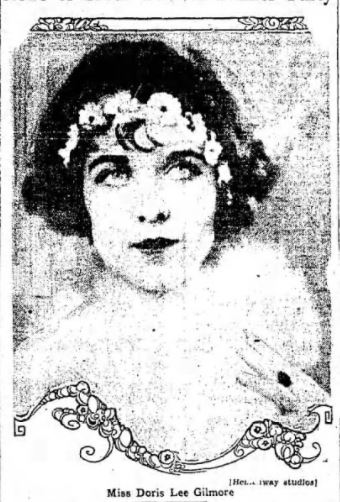
Doris Lee Gilmore

In 1883 Betty MacIndoe married George Davidson Gilmore (October 9, 1877 - December 30, 1944), son of Luke Henry Gilmore, in Denison, Texas, and they had one daughter, Doris Lee who will marry Alister McAllister Brown. She moved to California in 1911 and lived at 6366 Maryland Drive and 432 South Hobart Boulevard, Los Angeles, California. She devoted her free time to home-decoration creative endeavor and writing. After the death of her first husband in 1944, she remarried to John Wesley Halterman (June 23, 1872 - October 24, 1952).
