= Women's Improvement Club of Hueneme =

- U.S. National Register of Historic Places
- U.S. Historic district
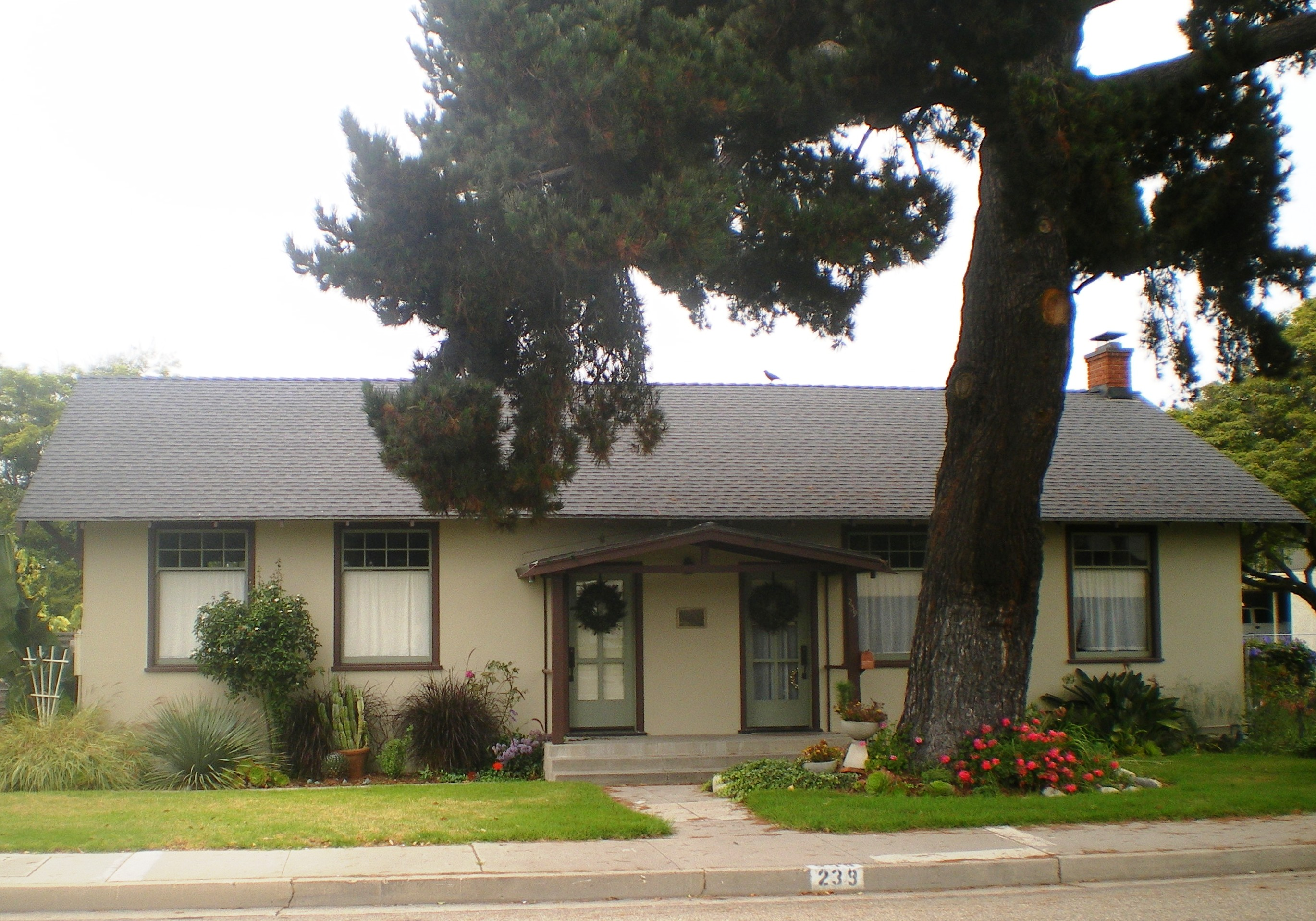

- Location within California Location within the United States
- Location: 239 E. Scott St., Port Hueneme, California
- Coordinates: 34°8′58″N 119°11′48″W
- Area: less than one acre
- Built: 1915
- Architectural style: Bungalow style/craftsman
- NRHP reference No.: 89001150
- Added to NRHP: August 21, 1989

The Women's Improvement Club of Hueneme is located at 239 E. Scott St. in Port Hueneme, Ventura County, California. It is a historic club whose building is listed on the National Register of Historic Places.

== Club ==
In 1989, the club was the oldest women's clubhouse in all of Ventura County and was still active. It was founded in 1909 by 15 women with goals to improve the town and to create a library. The club opened a library in 1909 at the A.O.U.W.

== Clubhouse ==
The Bungalow style clubhouse building was opened in 1915 as a clubhouse and library. It served as the town's library until 1935.

In 1935 it succeeded in having a regular public library opened.

Also known as Women's Improvement Club, it was listed on the National Register of Historic Places in 1989. The listing included one contributing building and one contributing site.

== See also ==
- Ebell Club of Santa Paula
- List of women's club buildings
- Ventura County Library System
- National Register of Historic Places listings in Ventura County, California
- Ventura County Historic Landmarks & Points of Interest
