= Ebell Club of Santa Paula =

Santa Paula Theater Center
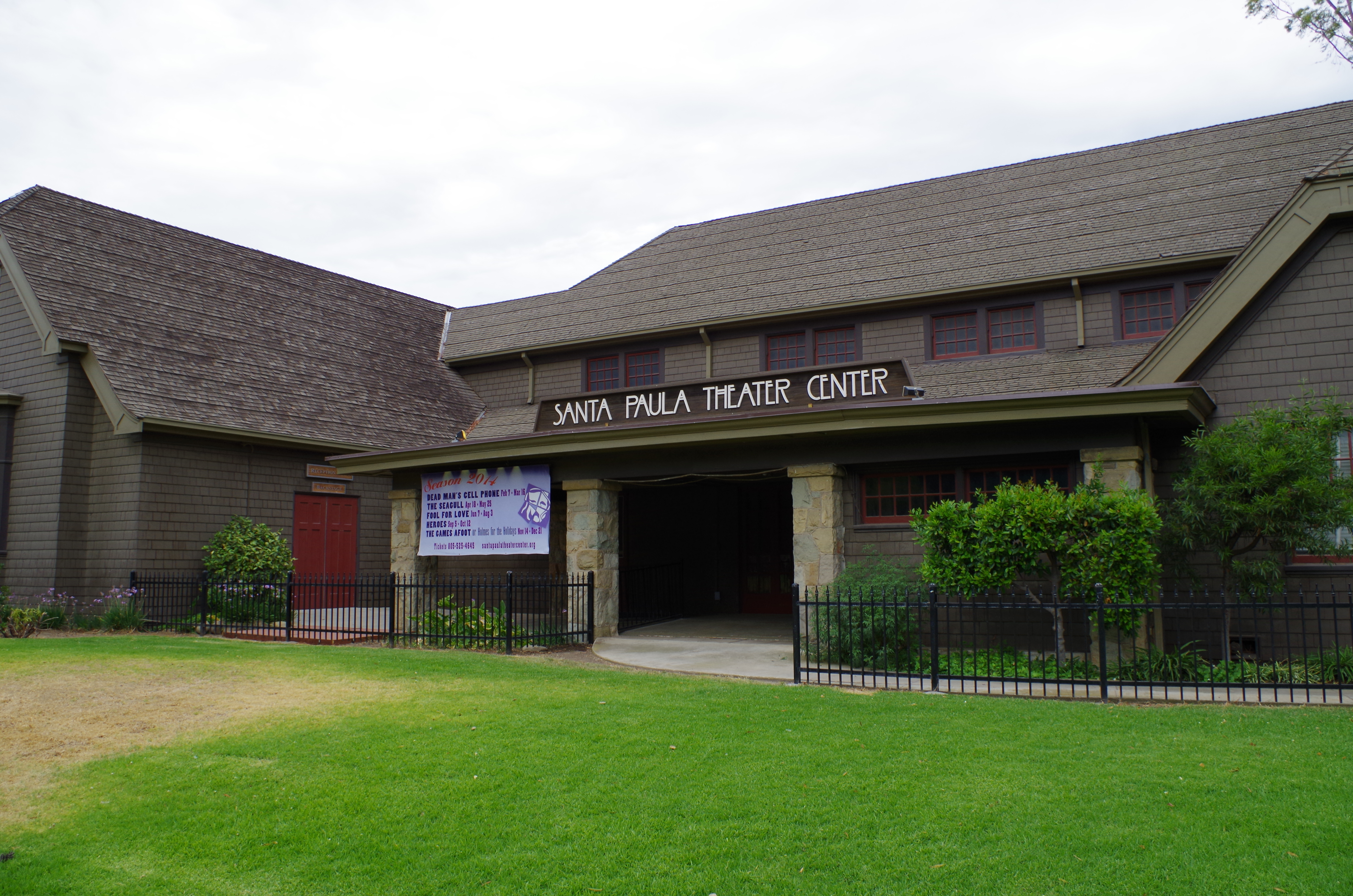
- Interactive map of Santa Paula Theater Center
- Former names: Ebell Club of Santa Paula
- Address: 125 S. Seventh St.
- Location: Santa Paula, California
- Type: Community theatre

Construction
- Renovated: 1987

Website
- www.santapaulatheatercenter.org
- Ebell Club of Santa Paula
- U.S. National Register of Historic Places
- Location within California Location within the United States
- Coordinates: 34°21′6″N 119°3′51″W
- Area: 1.3 acres (0.53 ha)
- Built: 1917
- Built by: Hudson, William A.
- Architect: Hunt & Burns
- Architectural style: Bungalow/Craftsman
- NRHP reference No.: 89000949
- Added to NRHP: July 20, 1989

The Ebell Club of Santa Paula is a 1917 mansion, built as a women's club with the aim of the advancement of culture, and now serving as the home of the Santa Paula Theater Center. The Santa Paula chapter, formed in 1913, was the ninth California women's club; the first was established in Oakland by Adrian Ebell in 1876, and the movement was involved in a range of progressive campaigning on social issues.

The building, at 125 S. Seventh Street, was designed by Hunt & Burns and built by contractor William A. Hudson. The clubhouse is in Bungalow/Craftsman style. It is surrounded by a park in English landscape garden style that was part of the original design for the club. Alice Stowell McKevett donated land for Ebell Park and contracted the first half of the building in memory of her husband. The dining room and kitchen were added in 1928 by Harriet McKevett Teague and the McKevett Corporation. In 1987 the McKevett Corporation deeded the building to the Santa Paula Community Fund, who in turn deeded it to the Santa Paula Theater Center. For several years the club and the thespians shared the space but the ladies have since parted to a space rented by the First United Methodist Church.

The property was listed on the National Register of Historic Places in 1989. Its NRHP nomination asserted it is "an outstanding example of the shingled Craftsman style", and the "only example of its type in Santa Paula where a Craftsman era institutional building was designed with a complementary landscape plan." It is also one of few preserved historic clubhouses in Ventura County and is the only women's clubhouse in Santa Paula.

== See also ==
- Ebell of Los Angeles
- Ebell Society
- Women's Improvement Club of Hueneme
- National Register of Historic Places listings in Ventura County, California
- Ventura County Historic Landmarks & Points of Interest
