= Ebell of Long Beach =

The Ebell Club

General information
- Address: 290 Cerritos Ave., Long Beach, CA 90802
- Coordinates: 33.77°N 118.18°W

Design and construction
- Architect(s): Raphael A. Nicholais, Charles T. McGrew

Website
- https://www.ebelllongbeach.com/

Ebell of Long Beach was a women's club in Long Beach, California. A chapter of the Ebell Society, it was one of the largest women's clubs in Southern California. The Long Beach chapter was established on November 16, 1896 by club president Adelaide Tichenor, a local civic leader, and seventeen other women. In the 1920s it had well over one thousand member and twenty departments.

Pearl Jane Pearson Brison was an organizer and served as a president.

The chapter closed in 2017. The chapter's historic building now provides an event space and loft residential units.

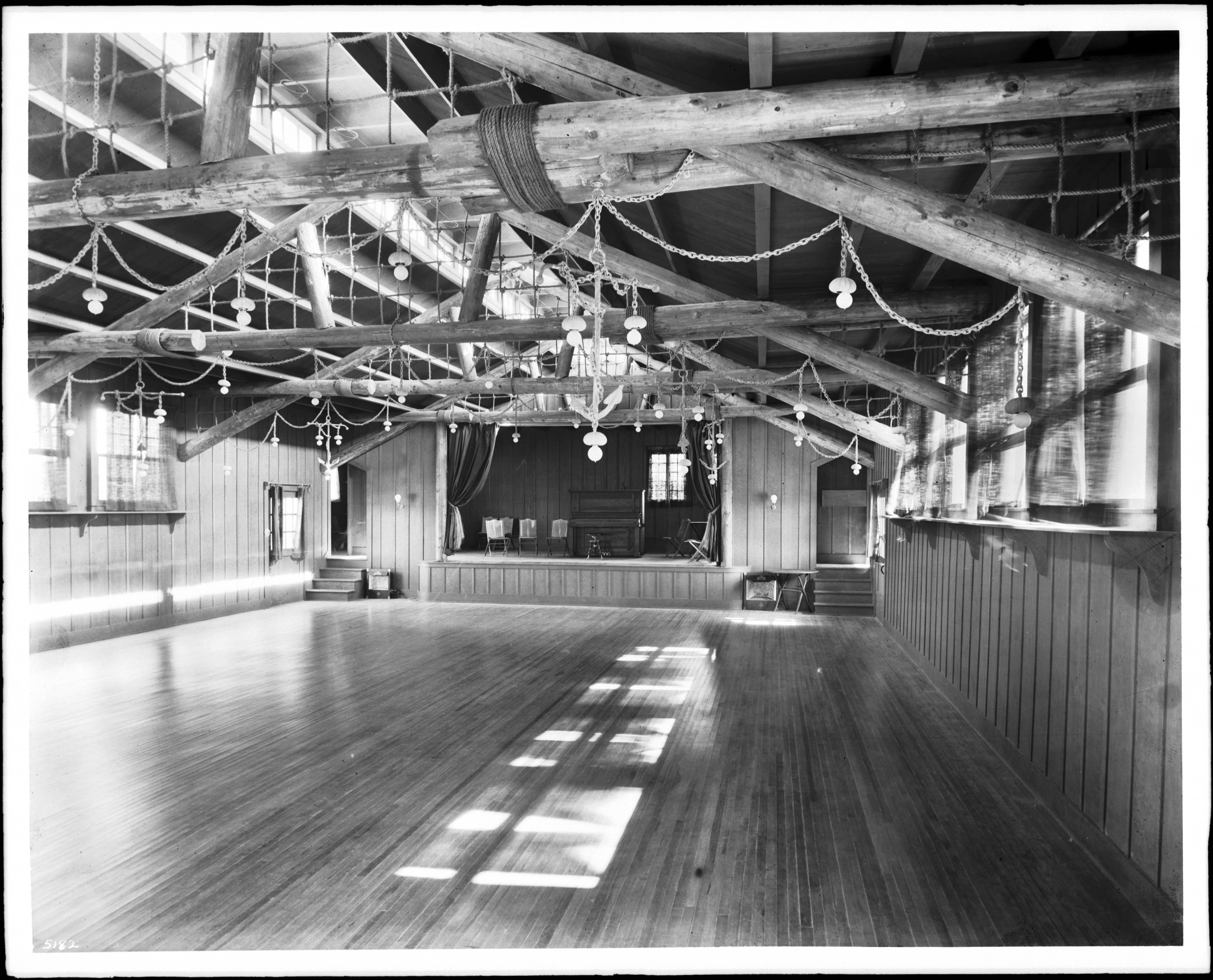
Interior view of the Ebell Club building in Long Beach, 1905
