= Adrian John Ebell =

American physician and educator

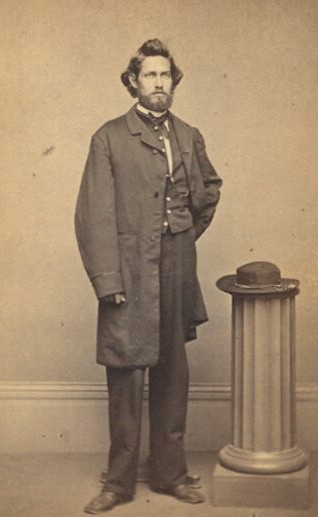
- Born: 1840
- Died: 1877 (aged 36–37)

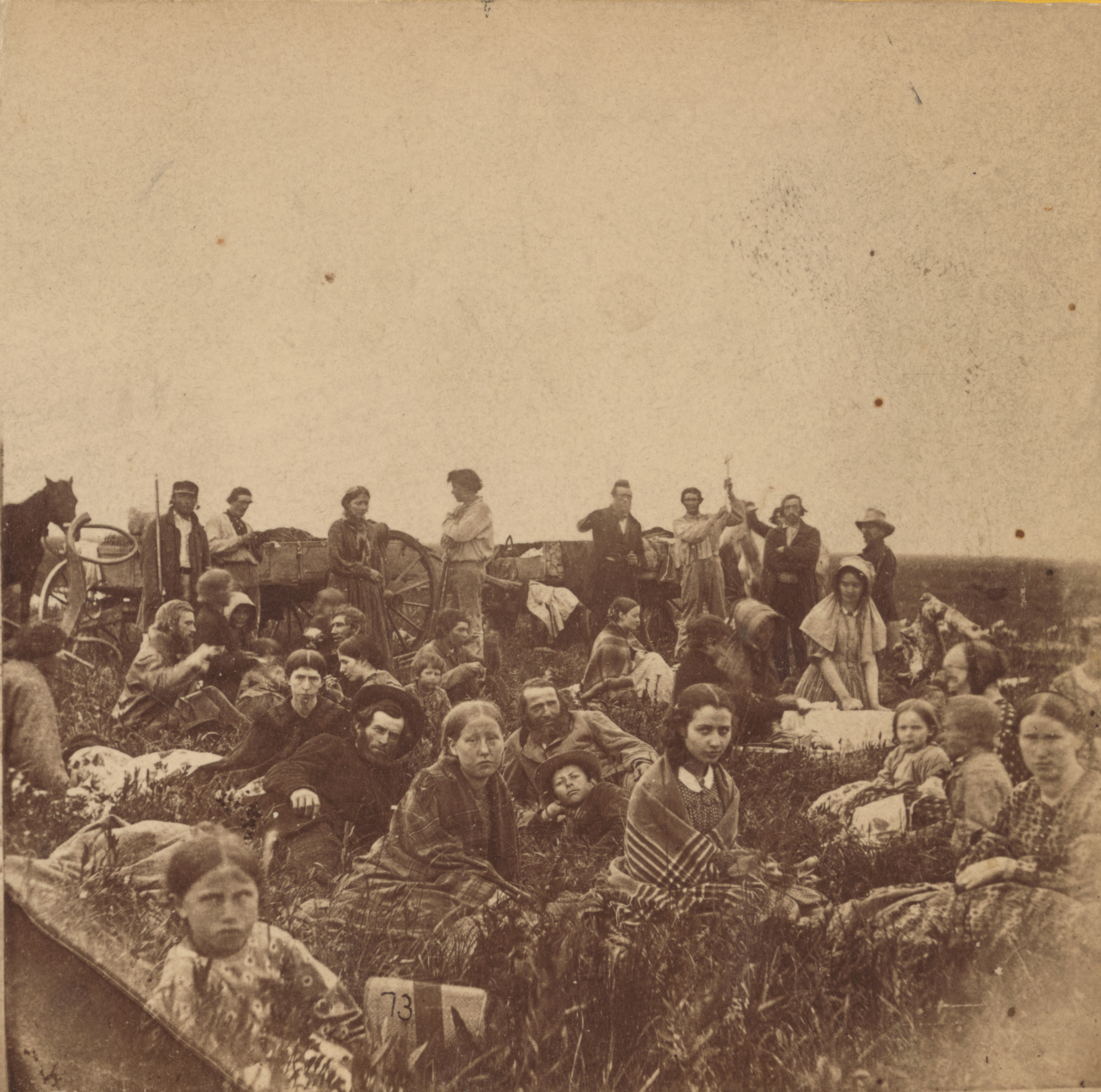
People escaping from the Indian massacre of 1862 in Minnesota, at dinner on a prairie

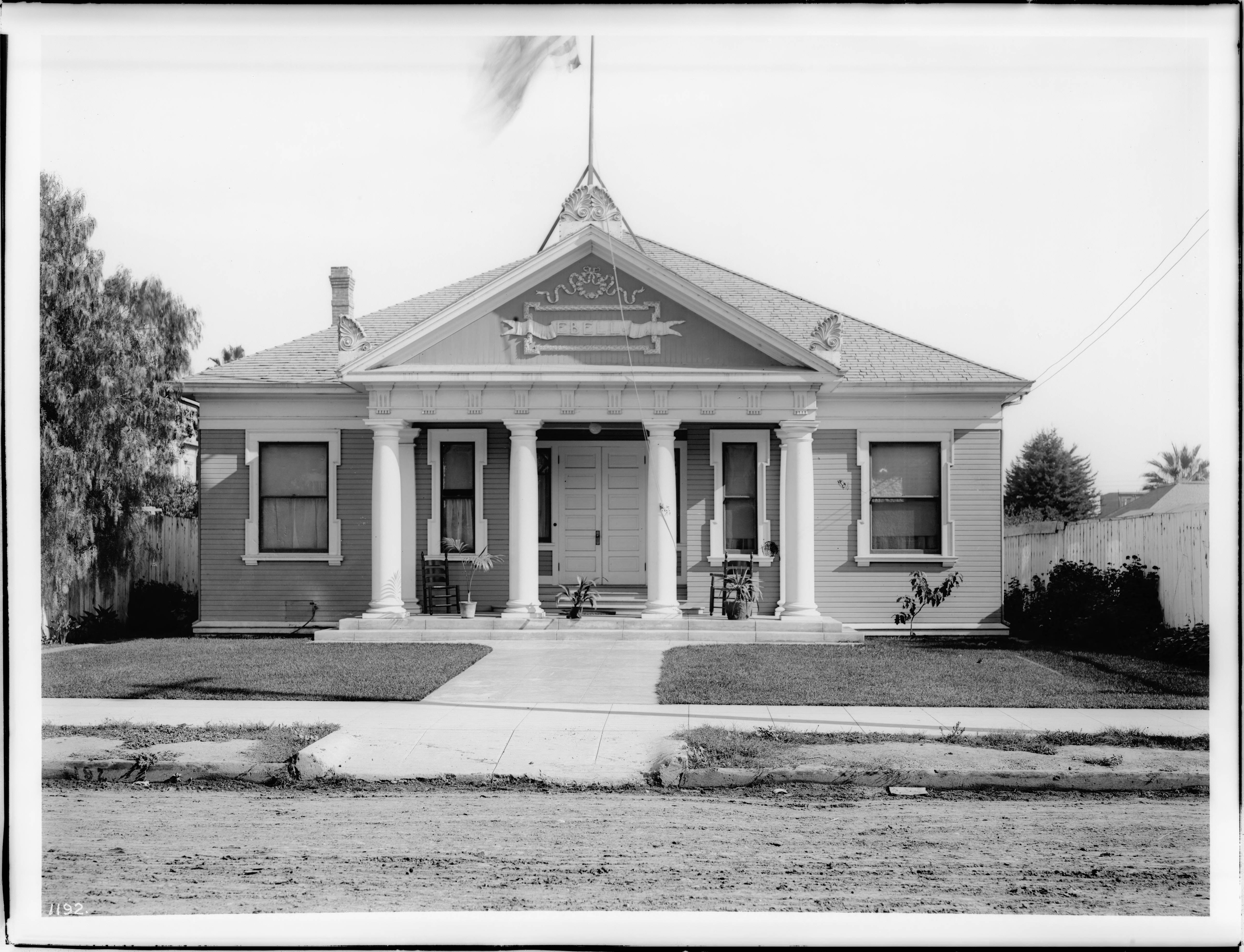
Ebell Club house in Los Angeles, ca.1905

Adrian John Ebell (September 20, 1840 – April 10, 1877) was a medical doctor, photographer, and proponent of women's education in the United States.

He was born in Jaffnapatam, Ceylon (now Jaffna, Sri Lanka), the son of Henry T. and Mary (Palm) Ebell, of English and Dutch ancestry. When about ten years of age, he was sent to the United States with an older sister to be educated. After preparatory school, he entered Yale University in 1858.

He then taught music in New Haven, Connecticut, and in Chicago, and then moved to Saint Paul, Minnesota, and took some noted photographs. He served for a short time in the Dakota War of 1862 in Minnesota with the rank of 1st Lieutenant. He wrote an article in June 1863 in Harper's Magazine titled "The Indian Massacres and War of 1862", which included the famous photograph "People escaping from the Indian massacre of 1862 in Minnesota, at dinner on a prairie". He then returned to Yale and graduated at the Scientific School in 1866 with a PhD.

He afterwards studied medicine at the Albany Medical College, graduating M.D. in 1869. In the meantime he had begun to lecture before schools and lyceums on natural science. In 1871 he established himself in New York City as director of the International Academy of Natural Science, which comprised a plan of travel and study in Europe for annually organized classes of young ladies.

He was married in September, 1874, to Oriana L., daughter of Dr. A.J. Steele, of New York. He embarked on the steamship Frisia from New York, on one of these study tours, late in March 1877 and died en route near Hamburg at age 37.

He had visited California in 1876, and organized a class in Oakland. After his death, the name "Ebell" was taken by that chapter of women's club. Other later chapters used the same name, including Ebell of Los Angeles and Ebell Club of Santa Paula.

== Sources ==
- Book By Princeton University, Yale University Class of 1863, Class of 1889 Published 1889

This article incorporates public domain material from the Yale Obituary Record.
