= Waters v. Churchill =

- Supreme Court of the United States

Argued December 1, 1993 Decided May 31, 1994
- Full case name: Cynthia Waters, Kathleen Davis, Stephen Hopper, and McDonough District Hospital, an Illinois municipal corporation, v. Cheryl R. Churchill and Thomas Koch, M.D
- Citations: 511 U.S. 661 (more) 114 S. Ct. 1878; 128 L. Ed. 2d 686
- Argument: Oral argument
- Opinion announcement: Opinion announcement

Case history
- Prior: Summary judgment for petitioners, 731 F. Supp. 311 (C.D. Ill. 1990); reversed, 977 F.2d 1114 (7th Cir. 1992); certiorari granted, 509 U.S. 903 (1993).

Holding
- Where public employer has reasonable belief that speech by employee on matter of public concern could reasonably disrupt employer's operations, employee's First Amendment rights are not violated by adverse action and trial of fact is not necessary to determine actual content of speech. Seventh Circuit vacated and remanded.

Court membership
- Chief Justice William Rehnquist Associate Justices Harry Blackmun · John P. Stevens; Sandra Day O'Connor · Antonin Scalia; Anthony Kennedy · David Souter; Clarence Thomas · Ruth Bader Ginsburg

Case opinions
- Plurality: O'Connor, joined by Rehnquist, Souter, Ginsburg
- Concurrence: Souter
- Concurrence: Scalia, joined by Kennedy, Thomas
- Dissent: Stevens, joined by Blackmun

Laws applied
- U.S. Const. Amendment I

Waters v. Churchill, 511 U.S. 661 (1994), is a United States Supreme Court case concerning the First Amendment rights of public employees in the workplace. By a 7–2 margin the justices held that it was not necessary to determine what a nurse at a public hospital had actually said while criticizing a supervisor's staffing practices to coworkers, as long as the hospital had formed a reasonable belief as to the content of her remarks and reasonably believed that they could be disruptive to its operations. They vacated a Seventh Circuit Court of Appeals ruling in her favor, and ordered the case remanded to district court to determine instead if the nurse had been fired for the speech or other reasons, per the Court's ruling two decades prior in Mt. Healthy City School District Board of Education v. Doyle.

The case had first been brought by Cheryl Churchill, a nurse in the obstetrics ward at McDonough District Hospital, operated by the city of Macomb, Illinois. During a dinner break one night in early 1987, she had been talking with another nurse who was considering transferring to obstetrics. In that conversation she made statements critical of cross-training practices recently implemented by the hospital's nursing supervisor, Cindy Waters, and referred to personal issues between the two. Another nurse who overheard the conversation believed Churchill's comments about Waters had dissuaded her interlocutor from the transfer, and reported it to Waters. After an investigation in which Churchill alleged she was never asked about what she had said, she was fired.

There were four separate opinions. Sandra Day O'Connor wrote for a four-justice plurality that the government has a lower obligation to respect constitutional rights when it acts as employer rather than as the sovereign. Accordingly, in that situation it should not be required to meet a due process standard greater than the reasonableness of its own finding of fact. David Souter added a short concurring opinion qualifying the plurality, which he said was in fact a majority, with his insistence that in such cases the government must demonstrate that its understanding of what the employee said was not only a reasonable belief but a truthful one. Antonin Scalia concurred as well, but harshly criticized O'Connor's opinion. He read it as requiring a procedural handling of every possible adverse personnel action where First Amendment rights might be implicated, providing "more questions than answers". John Paul Stevens' dissent argued that the First Amendment required that the lower court determine exactly what Churchill had said before ruling on whether it was protected.

Outside commentators have also been critical of the decision, since it might discourage whistleblowers. In addition to echoing Stevens' concerns, they have seen it as abandoning any concern for the truth, imposing a heavy burden on a plaintiff, relying on an overly narrow conception of the public's interest, and possibly discouraging people from entering public service. The decision resulted in a lower court changing its ruling in a high-profile case involving controversial academic Leonard Jeffries.

== Dispute ==
Churchill had been hired as a part-time nurse at McDonough in 1982, and promoted to full-time status three years later. She worked for the next two years in the obstetrics ward. She had generally received favorable performance evaluations until Waters became her supervisor in the middle of 1986.

That happened a few months after Kathy Davis took over as the hospital's vice president of nursing. Waters had been implementing Davis's policy of cross-training, under which nurses were in areas overstaffed on a particular shift were reassigned to departments that needed more nurses. Churchill was one of several employees who had voiced objections to the way the policy was being implemented. She and other critics feared that it was primarily being used to address staffing shortages without providing adequate training, with detrimental effects on patient care.

Churchill's criticisms had been long voiced by one of the hospital's obstetricians, Dr. Thomas Koch. During a 1982 malpractice suit he had blamed a stillbirth on nursing shortages created, he alleged, by hospital policies, and had continued the criticism since then. Churchill and he became friends and allies, with her providing inside information on nursing policies that he then used to criticize the administration. She believed this incurred her the enmity of administrators who were by summer of 1986 keeping a file of criticisms of Koch made by Davis and nursing supervisor Cindy Waters.

That August, an incident occurred that bore out Churchill and Koch's concerns, and began the sequence of events that led to the lawsuit. During a difficult delivery, Koch called for a "Code pink" emergency, indicating danger to the life of mother and/or child. A probationary nurse, Mary Lou Ballew, did not know how to properly signal the emergency and did not alert all the necessary personnel. Churchill responded and helped Koch prepare for an emergency Cesarean section.

After the surgery, Churchill was completing paperwork in the delivery room when Waters looked in on a patient in the early stages of labor Churchill had been attending to across the hall. She ordered Churchill to check on that patient. Churchill responded "You don't need to tell me what to do", and then complied with the order. Koch was very upset by this interference. At a meeting the next day with Waters and Stephen Hopper, the hospital's president and chief executive officer, he criticized Waters' conduct and the effect of the cross-training policies.

Churchill was later given a written warning for insubordination; she chose not to either make a written response or file a grievance, which she had the right to do, as she "did not want to make mountains out of molehills". Waters' annual evaluation of Churchill was overall positive, but noted an increasing antipathy toward her. In January 1987, a cross-trainee, Melanie Perkins-Graham, mentioned to Churchill over dinner during a meal break, with Koch present, that she was considering transferring to obstetrics. The exact nature of the ensuing conversation was central to the ensuing dispute.

Since the break room was located immediately behind the main nurse's station in obstetrics, others overheard all or part of it. Ballew, whose work-related absences from the nurses' station limited her exposure to the conversation, and head nurse Jean Welty, were among them. The next morning Ballew told Davis that Churchill had spent 20 minutes "knocking the department" and specifically criticizing Waters and Davis, saying the former was trying to get her fired and the latter "was going to ruin this hospital". After the conversation, Ballew claimed, Perkins-Graham was no longer interested in transferring. The morning afterwards, Davis asked Perkins-Graham to tell her about the conversation.

Perkins-Graham told her that Churchill "had indeed said unkind and inappropriate negative things about Cindy Waters" and confirmed the complaints about the ward and the criticism of Davis. Davis decided to fire Churchill for what she considered continued insubordination, but did not do so until after she had consulted with Waters, Hopper and the hospital's personnel director. Churchill appealed to Hopper, her only recourse under the hospital's employee policy, but after a meeting with her and the personnel director he told her that the negative evaluation the month before counted as a second written warning and thus her termination had followed the proper process.

Churchill took her case to federal court. Her suit in the Central District of Illinois in Peoria named Waters, Davis, Hopper and the hospital as defendants. She alleged violations of her First Amendment right to free speech and Fourteenth Amendment right to due process under Section 1983, and breach of contract under Illinois law.

== Lower courts ==
=== District court ===
In a deposition, Churchill gave her version of the break room conversation she had had with Perkins-Graham that had led to her dismissal. She had repeated her earlier criticisms, which were not of cross-training in itself but merely the way Davis had implemented it. A specific concern of hers was the hospital's requirement that obstetric nurses who had reassigned to another department shower and change before returning to obstetrics, in an apparent effort to circumvent a regulatory requirement that nurses assigned to obstetrics remain there for an entire shift or not return if they were temporarily assigned elsewhere.

As to whether her comments about Waters had been as continuous and negative as Perkins-Graham and Ballew had asserted, Churchill testified that she had not had a problem with Waters and felt she could have a good working relationship with her. Welty, the chief shift nurse on duty that night, who had overheard most of the conversation from the nearby nurses' station, corroborated Churchill's version. She further recalled that Perkins-Graham had said she had only one reservation about transferring to obstetrics—Waters. Churchill, Welty testified, had actually defended Waters, saying she had a difficult job and was sometimes moody, but that could be accommodated.

After the depositions had been taken and briefs filed, the defendants moved for summary judgement. Judge Michael M. Mihm granted it on all but the First Amendment claim. Much of his opinion, handed down in early 1990, consisted of a lengthy explication of Illinois case law on contract formation as it applied to language in the hospital's employee handbook. He held that it did not constitute a firm offer of continued employment and thus could not be considered a contract Churchill had become party to by continuing to work once aware of its terms. Since there was no contract to breach, there could be no denial of due process rights. He could not grant summary judgement on the First Amendment claim since there was a factual dispute in that area, and ordered a status conference to be held the next month with a magistrate.

Churchill then moved for summary judgement on the remaining claim, arguing that she had been fired without a determination that she had been engaging in protected speech on a matter of public concern, and that her rights to freedom of association with Dr. Koch had also been abridged, in violation of her due process rights. The defendants cross-moved for the same, arguing failure to state a claim on the free-association claim. They denied she had been engaging in protected speech, and that even if it were, she would still have been fired for undermining the hospital administration.

Mihm found Churchill's speech "inherently disruptive". Echoing Perkins-Graham's description of it as a "bitch session", and noting "history of hostility between Churchill and her supervisors", he found she intended "not to inform but rather to gripe." He entered judgement for the defendants.

=== Appeal ===
Churchill then appealed Mihm's ruling to the Seventh Circuit Court of Appeals. Koch, whom she married in 1991, joined the case as an appellant, arguing that Waters, Davis and Hopper had tried to have his privileges revoked as retaliation for his role in the incident. A three-judge panel of Richard Dickson Cudahy, John Louis Coffey and Daniel Anthony Manion heard the case in February 1992. Eight months later, they ruled in favor of Churchill.

Coffey's opinion considered three issues: whether the district court had properly found Churchill's criticisms of Waters, Davis and cross-training did not touch on a matter of public concern, whether the appellants' failure to determine that before firing her had been a due process violation and whether they were entitled to qualified immunity from the suit since they argued there was no settled law on the subject. To resolve the first issue, he turned to the relevant case law on the subject.

In 1968's Pickering v. Board of Education, the Supreme Court had overturned the firing of an Illinois high-school teacher for writing a letter to the editor in a local newspaper critical of the school board's handling of a recent tax increase. That case had established that public employees had First Amendment rights to "comment on matters of public interest in connection with the operations of the public [entity] in which they work." A decade later, Givhan v. Western Line Consolidated School District had extended that protection to an employee speaking privately to a superior about such issues.

The most important precedent for Churchill's case was 1983's Connick v. Myers, where the Court had upheld the dismissal of an assistant district attorney who had circulated questionnaires among her coworkers about office policy and named superiors in the wake of a transfer she had resisted. In that case the deciding issue had been that the questionnaire had largely concerned matters of personal, not public, concern. Coffey quoted that case's holding that courts "must determine the content, form, and context of a given statement, as revealed by the whole record." Circuit precedent, from shortly after Connick, held that the content of the speech was the most important of those three.

Under the Federal Rules of Civil Procedure, the appeals court could not make a determination as to the content of the disputed speech. Instead, Coffey wrote, it would rule on the status of Churchill's speech, reviewing the record and considering it in the light most favorable to her, as the party in opposition to the motion for summary judgement.

"It is evident that the District Court's grant of summary judgment was in error," wrote Coffey. In her deposition, Churchill had discussed at length her criticisms of how cross-training had been implemented, and her concerns that the policy requiring a shower and change of clothes for nurses returning to the obstetric ward from another department was a possible violation of state regulations. "She was undoubtedly speaking about a matter of public concern", the judge concluded. He chastised the hospital for its apparent violations, quoting from and discussing at length the standards of the Joint Commission on Accreditation of Healthcare Organizations on cross-training to demonstrate that this was a matter of public concern. "[T]he content of the speech is a question of fact for the jury," Coffey concluded.

Churchill argues that the point of her speech was to bring the violation of state nursing regulations to light and to discuss the risks to patients because of the inadequacy of the hospital's cross-training policy, while the hospital asserts that the tenor of the conversation was to express antagonism to the administration. The determination of such an issue is best resolved through giving the judge or jury the opportunity to observe the verbal and non-verbal behavior of the witnesses focusing on the subject's reactions and responses to the interrogatories, their facial expressions, attitudes, tone of voice, eye contact, posture and body movements, rather than looking at the cold pages of depositions, which is all the court had before it on the summary judgment motion. A witness's behavior during the trial can very well reveal deception or untruthfulness through evasiveness on the witness stand that is more frequently than not undiscernible in the pages of a deposition.

Coffey turned next to the context, addressing Mihm's holding that under the Pickering balancing test, the hospital was permitted to fire Churchill because her speech was sufficiently disruptive to it even if it had been on a matter of public concern. It was erroneous, he wrote, because it ignored Jean Welty's testimony that had corroborated Churchill's account of the conversation. Further, she had professional obligations to act under the code of the American Nursing Association, which Coffey quoted in relevant part. "Cheryl Churchill's actions fall far short of the actions of an insubordinate or problem employee", he wrote. "[Her] interest in fulfilling her duties and obligations as an ethical, responsible professional ... clearly outweighs the hospital's interests in interfering and ultimately preventing her from speaking out on important matters of public concern." Further, the animosity between Churchill and her superiors was, upon further examination, "nothing but a one sided demonstration of hostility toward Churchill."

The next argument Coffey considered was due process. The Mt. Healthy defense raised by the hospital was that Churchill had not demonstrated that her speech was why she was fired. In response she had argued that the hospital violated her due process rights by not investigating the actual content of her speech. "We disagree" wrote Coffey, "that it is necessary to create a First Amendment due process right in order to protect the rights of public employees to speak out on matters of public concern, for we believe that Mt. Healthy provides adequate safeguards regardless of whether the employer actually knew the precise content of the statements for which it fired the employee."

The hospital believed it had overcome Mt. Healthy, since it claimed Churchill was fired for her general pattern of complaining rather than the conversation with Perkins-Graham. Coffey said that was a misreading of that holding, which was meant to protect conduct.

If on remand the jury determines that the point of Churchill's conversation was to raise the issues of inadequate nurse staffing resulting in inept patient care and even danger to patients because of the allegedly ill-conceived and inept cross-training policy rather than simply to complain, then she was engaged in protected conduct. We hold that when a public employer fires an employee for engaging in speech, and that speech is later found to be protected under the First Amendment, the employer is liable for violating the employee's free-speech rights regardless of what the employer knew at the time of termination.

Lastly, he dismissed the defendants' claim to qualified immunity, under which officials who engage in conduct which may later be found illegal are immune from prosecution or suit if they can demonstrate a lack of settled law on it at the time, for the same underlying reasons. "[I]n 1987 the law was clear that the speech of public employees while at work was protected under the First Amendment if it was about matters of public concern in connection with their workplace," Coffey wrote. "[W]e hold that ignorance of the nature of the employee's speech (in particular in light of the record before us) is inadequate to insulate officials from a § 1983 action."

The court amended its decision the day after handing it down. Two months later a motion for rehearing was denied. The appellees then petitioned the Supreme Court for certiorari. In order to resolve a conflict the case had created with similar cases in other appellate circuits where qualified immunity was at issue, (Note: Atcherson v. Siebenmann, 605 F. 2d 1058, (8th Cir., 1979), judge granted qualified immunity when acting as administrator disciplining probation officer for letter alleging misconduct by coworkers; Wulf v. Wichita , 883 F. 2d 842 (10th Cir., 1989), reasonable police chief should have been aware that allegations of anti-union bias were protected speech; and Sims v. Metropolitan Dade County, 972 F. 2d 1230 (11th Cir., 1992), county officials should have been reasonably aware that off-duty sermon by employee in church was protected speech.) the Court granted the request in 1993.

== Supreme Court ==
=== Before the Court ===
The federal government filed an amicus curiae brief urging reversal, along with the International City/County Management Association. Amici urging affirmance came from the National Education Association and Southern States Police Benevolent Association. The National Employment Lawyers Association (NELA) filed an amicus brief on behalf of Petitioners, Waters, et al.. In it, NELA's counsel of record argued, inter alia, that the firing of a public employee for uttering speech subjectively deemed by a public employer to be deemed "insubordinate" is an unconstitutionally vague and overbroad employment of the employees First Amendment rights.

Oral arguments were heard in December 1993. Lawrence Manson, arguing for the hospital and other original defendants as petitioners, was joined by assistant Solicitor General Richard Seamon. John Bisbee, who had represented Churchill and Koch from the beginning, argued their case.

Manson began by attacking the Seventh Circuit's "unprecedented holding". Churchill, he argued, had to show that the defendants were aware that her speech was protected. "[A]ll the defendants knew about was comments of personal matters, grievances against the supervisor." He quoted at length from Ballew's deposition to support that contention. If Churchill had wanted to contest the veracity of Ballew's report, she had the opportunity to do so when Davis fired her, but chose not to do so.

The justices challenged him at length on the implications of that theory, whether it would apply to a more clear-cut situation where the employer had acted on mistaken information. Manson insisted that under the Mt. Healthy rule that would not be a violation of the First Amendment. He also insisted that it covered a case where the motive for the firing was clearly the speech and not any other associated conduct. Seamon, too, was questioned on this as well, with the same result. "[I]n an employment at will situation like this one, the Government can discharge an employee for any reason or no reason at all, as long as it is not motivated by a desire to retaliate against the employee for engaging in protected speech."

Bisbee was asked the same question, but preferred to focus on the facts of his case. He stressed that "[w]hat was reported to them was basically a headline: 'Things were bad in OB and the administration was responsible.'" Justice Sandra Day O'Connor asked about the Pickering test: "Do you think that even protected speech could also serve to demonstrate sufficient disruption to the employer's operation that a firing could be justified?" Bisbee conceded that it could, but "it seems to me there has got to be some reasonable basis for thinking that the speech was doing that."

How, he was later asked, could the Seventh Circuit's holding that an employer could be held liable for adverse action against speech believed to be unprotected but later held otherwise be reconciled with qualified immunity? "Number one, I disagree with that," he said. "Unfortunately that's the question cert was granted on", came the reply. Bisbee insisted that the record did not support that reading, that it was merely a dictum and that he himself had not so argued.

When pressed about this again later, some sharp exchanges resulted. Bisbee said "the Court doesn't even really need to reach that question". "Suppose we think we need to reach that decision" he was told. "[W]e didn't take this case to determine who said what in the cafeteria. We determine this case to see what the rule of law ought to be if an employer acts on reasonable, substantiated information, but is wrong." Bisbee suggested that the Seventh Circuit had perhaps used "language that was broader than it needed to", to which O'Connor responded that it might need to be sent back since even he declined to defend their legal theory. "It seems to me that you can affirm the judgment and say that the legal test employed by the Seventh Circuit was not altogether correct," he proposed.

=== Decision ===
The Court announced its decision May 31, 1994. Seven justices had agreed to vacate the Seventh Circuit and remand the case to district court for a determination of what exactly Churchill was fired for. Three justices joined Sandra Day O'Connor in a plurality opinion. David Souter, a member of that plurality, added a concurrence of his own. Antonin Scalia wrote a separate concurrence, joined by two other justices. John Paul Stevens wrote for himself and Harry Blackmun that the First Amendment was important enough that Churchill was entitled to the trial she sought to determine what she said.

==== Majority ====
The plurality, joined by Chief Justice William Rehnquist, David Souter and Ruth Bader Ginsburg, held that the appeals court had proposed a test too onerous to the government to be broadly applied, but agreed that there was enough of a factual dispute over what Churchill had been fired for to remand the case to district court for that determination. Souter added a concurrence clarifying that the employers can act against unprotected employee speech when they believe their facts about the speech to be true, rather than just the result of a reasonable investigation. He also noted that, since the plurality holding had been joined by the other majority justices in one aspect and the dissenting justices in another, it was in fact a majority opinion.

In a separate concurrence, Antonin Scalia wrote for himself, Clarence Thomas and Anthony Kennedy that adverse personnel actions for speech by public employees violate the First Amendment only when their purpose is clearly retaliatory, as he believed it had been in Pickering. He attacked the plurality opinion as creating a poorly defined procedural requirement that might well prove unworkable in practice.

===== Plurality opinion =====
"There is no dispute in this case about when speech by a government employee is protected by the First Amendment," began O'Connor's analysis, after she recounted the facts of the case. "The dispute is over how the factual basis for applying the test—what the speech was, in what tone it was delivered, what the listener's reactions were—is to be determined." She agreed with Churchill that some reliable procedures were necessary to protect First Amendment rights, and cited several cases that imposed such procedural requirements, primarily in the area of defamation law.

O'Connor rejected the narrower protection Scalia advocated in his concurrence. "Speech can be chilled and punished by administrative action as much as by judicial processes; in no case have we asserted or even implied the contrary." To the plurality, however, it did not follow that all possible procedural review was constitutionally necessary. The Court had in some past defamation cases declined to apply the actual malice standard, even though doing so would strengthen free-speech protections, she noted.

It was, O'Connor agreed with Scalia, inconvenient that no general test existed for these cases. So, "[w]e must therefore reconcile ourselves to answering the question on a case-by-case basis, at least until some workable general rule emerges." The general principle, from Pickering and previous cases had established that "the government as employer indeed has far broader powers than does the government as sovereign". No one, she suggested, would dispute that a government agency could bar its employees from wearing, on the job, clothing decorated with profanity, despite the Court's Cohen v. California holding that such behavior could not sustain a prosecution for disorderly conduct. The Court had also upheld the Hatch Act's limitations on political activity by federal employees on several occasions, she noted. (Note: Broadrick v. Oklahoma, 413 U.S. 601 (1973); United States Civil Service Commission v. National Association of Letter Carriers, 413 U.S. 548 (1973) and United Public Workers v. Mitchell, 330 U.S. 75 (1947).)

Those past cases, O'Connor continued, had shown deference to the government's opinion of what speech acts by employees in the workplace would be disruptive to the government's interest in providing public services efficiently, again in ways the Court had not with cases concerning speech in general.

The restrictions discussed above are allowed not just because the speech interferes with the government's operation. Speech by private people can do the same, but this does not allow the government to suppress it. Rather, the extra power the government has in this area comes from the nature of the government's mission as employer. Government agencies are charged by law with doing particular tasks. Agencies hire employees to help do those tasks as effectively and efficiently as possible. When someone who is paid a salary so that she will contribute to an agency's effective operation begins to do or say things that detract from the agency's effective operation, the government employer must have some power to restrain her.

The Seventh Circuit's requirement "would force the government employer to come to its factual conclusions through procedures that substantially mirror the evidentiary rules used in court", O'Connor wrote. Hearsay evidence might not be usable, and credibility judgements might not be shared by a jury or judge. Yet both were regularly used by both public and private employers in making personnel decisions. "Government employers should be allowed to use [them], without fear that these differences will lead to liability."

What O'Connor did allow was that the public employer's decision must be the result of "the care that a reasonable manager would use before making an employment decision". She again responded to Scalia, who had said precedent made that standard applicable only where the employment had some sort of contractual basis and was not at-will or probationary. "We believe that the possibility of inadvertently punishing someone for exercising her First Amendment rights makes such care necessary." She then addressed Stevens' claim in dissent that this was less protection than the Court had required for lesser rights. "We have never held that it is a violation of the Constitution for a government employer to discharge an employee based on substantively incorrect information. Where an employee has a property interest in her job, the only protection we have found the Constitution gives her is a right to adequate procedure."

Applying this analysis to the facts of the case, she concluded that hospital management had made a reasonable decision of what Churchill had said before firing her.

After getting the initial report from Ballew, who overheard the conversation, Waters and Davis approached and interviewed Perkins-Graham, and then interviewed Ballew again for confirmation. In response to Churchill's grievance, Hopper met directly with Churchill to hear her side of the story, and instructed Magin to interview Ballew one more time. Management can spend only so much of their time on anyone employment decision. By the end of the termination process, Hopper, who made the final decision, had the word of two trusted employees, the endorsement of those employees' reliability by three hospital managers, and the benefit of a face-to-face meeting with the employee he fired. With that in hand, a reasonable manager could have concluded that no further time needed to be taken.

And what they believed Churchill to have said, under Connick, was disruptive enough to justify adverse action regardless of whether it addressed a public concern, which the plurality declined to decide. "Discouraging people from coming to work for a department certainly qualifies as disruption." Perkins-Graham herself had told Davis she didn't think the hospital could "tolerate that kind of negativism" much longer, and if Churchill had indeed denied the possibility of getting along with Waters, Churchill's continued effectiveness as a nurse under Waters' supervision could be reasonably expected to be diminished.

Despite this, O'Connor agreed with Churchill and the Seventh Circuit that Mihm had erred in granting summary judgement against the nurse. "[She] has produced enough evidence to create a material issue of disputed fact about petitioners' actual motivation." It was possible that a trier of fact could find, in certain other actions by the hospital management, evidence that her non-disruptive, and therefore protected, criticisms of the implementation of the cross-training policy. That conclusion foreclosed the need to decide the qualified immunity question that had been discussed so heavily at oral argument. The Seventh Circuit's decision was vacated and the case remanded to district court to decide what action of Churchill's had motivated the firing.

===== Souter concurrence =====
David Souter, one of the four justices in the plurality, added his own concurrence. He wished "to emphasize that, in order to avoid liability, the public employer must not only reasonably investigate the third-party report, but must also actually believe it." Without that criterion, he argued, the government "can assert no legitimate interest strong enough to justify chilling protected expression." That left it open for Churchill to argue on remand that the putatively disruptive speech issue was merely a pretext for an unjustified, retaliatory firing over her criticisms of the cross-training implementation.

He also clarified that the plurality's holding was the one lower courts should look to in future cases, per the standard for divided majority opinions announced in the 1977 obscenity case Marks v. United States. Seven justices agreed that public employers who acted on a reasonable belief of the content of employee speech had met their constitutional burden, and the plurality and dissent both supported a view that public employers who did not had violated the First Amendment. Therefore, the plurality was in fact a majority with its components joined by different justices.

===== Scalia concurrence =====
"This recognition", Scalia began, "of a broad new First Amendment procedural right is in my view unprecedented, superfluous to the decision in the present case, unnecessary for protection of public-employee speech on matters of public concern, and unpredictable in its application and consequences." He agreed that sometimes procedures were necessary to protect First Amendment rights. Most of the cases the plurality had cited were from defamation law, which was primarily enforced through litigation, thus making procedural safeguards a necessary subject of discussion.

"Although we are assured that 'not every procedure that may safeguard protected speech is constitutionally mandated,' the implication of that assurance is that many are'" Scalia continued. The plurality had provided little guidance in that area. He could not reconcile this due-process requirement with other cases (Note: Scalia specifically cites Board of Regents of State Colleges v. Roth, 408 U.S. 564 (1972), in this regard.) where the Court had ruled that at-will public employees, lacking a property interest in their jobs, were not entitled to this level of process in adverse personnel actions. He found it absurd that there was no need to investigate if the dismissal was for other causes, whether erroneously believed or not., But if speech was involved, the matter would have to be investigated, after which an adverse action could proceed, even if the investigation had produced inaccurate information about the content of the speech, as long as it did not touch on matters of public concern.

In the present case, for example, if the requisite "First Amendment investigation" disclosed that Nurse Churchill had not been demeaning her superiors, but had been complaining about the perennial end-of-season slump of the Chicago Cubs, her dismissal, erroneous as it was, would have been perfectly OK ... This is strange jurisprudence indeed.

Scalia argued that the plurality had not created new procedural protections for the First Amendment, "but rather new First Amendment rights". Pickering had held that public employees must be free to speak on issues of public concern without fear of retaliation, and he considered that the important factor. "A category of employee speech is certainly not being 'retaliated against' if it is no more and no less subject to being mistaken for a disciplinable infraction than is any other category of speech or conduct." He found the procedural test "doubly irrelevant" since not only had the plurality found the hospital to have satisfied it, they then remanded the case so the district court could conduct a trial on whether the speech was a pretext for a retaliatory firing. Since that had been the result of Mt. Healthy he found no need for a new requirement in this case, and cited other areas where the Court had found a pretext inquiry sufficient to protect constitutional rights.

In response to Stevens' dissent, he said such an inquiry had been held constitutionally inadequate only where there was a contractual relationship, which Churchill did not have. "An employee dismissable at will can be fired on the basis of an erroneous factual judgment, with no legal recourse—which is what happened here." Her only protection was the Pickering holding that she could not be retaliated against, and the plurality was not so much reinforcing that as expanding it to cover employer mistakes.

The plurality opinion "provides more questions than answers, subjecting public employers to intolerable legal uncertainty", Scalia concluded. He went through all the hypothetical questions they would have to ask under the decision, and possible remedies that might be derived from it due to the lack of guidance on the question. "Loose ends are the inevitable consequence of judicial invention", he wrote. "We will spend decades trying to improvise the limits of this new First Amendment procedure that is unmentioned in text and unformed by tradition."

==== Dissent ====
For private-sector employees, Stevens wrote, the exercise of their First Amendment rights to speak on matters of public concern "may entail unpleasant consequences." But public employees were entitled to greater protections. "As long as that expression is not unduly disruptive, it simply may not provide the basis for discipline or termination."

Stevens believed there was no real factual dispute as to the basis of Churchill's termination—the dinner-break conversation. The Court had to assume it was protected speech, per procedure, but the plurality had concluded that what mattered was that the hospital reasonably believed it was not. "This conclusion is erroneous because it provides less protection for a fundamental constitutional right than the law ordinarily provides for less exalted rights, including contractual and statutory rights applicable in the private sector."

Had Churchill been a contractual employee, fired in the mistaken belief that she had failed to perform her job adequately, she would have been entitled to relief, he noted. "Ordinarily, when someone acts to another person's detriment based upon a factual judgment, the actor assumes the risk that an impartial adjudicator may come to a different conclusion". The Court, he noted, had done just that in National Labor Relations Board v. Burnup & Sims, Inc., when it upheld the board's order to reinstate two workers fired in the mistaken belief that they had threatened violence if a union certification vote failed.

Doubts concerning the ability of juries to find the truth, an ability for which we usually have high regard, should be resolved in favor of, not against, the protection of First Amendment rights ... [T]he plurality underestimates the importance of freedom of speech for the more than 18 million civilian employees of this country's federal, state, and local governments, and subordinates that freedom to an abstract interest in bureaucratic efficiency ... [which] does not demand an additional layer of deference to employers' "reasonable" factual errors. Today's ruling will surely deter speech that would be fully protected under Pickering and Connick.

Stevens criticized Scalia's approach as derived solely from the use of the word "retaliation" in the cases Scalia had cited. In all those cases, there had been no factual dispute over the content of the speech. Two, Pickering and Perry v. Sindermann suggested that a "causal connection between the employee's speech and her discharge is all the 'retaliation' that must be shown."

Stevens saw the issue in very stark terms.

A First Amendment claimant need not allege bad faith; the controlling question is not the regularity of the agency's investigative procedures, or the purity of its motives, but whether the employee's freedom of speech has been "abridged" ... The risk that a jury may ultimately view the facts differently from even a conscientious employer is not, as the plurality would have it, a needless fetter on public employers' ability to discharge their duties. It is the normal means by which our legal system protects legal rights and encourages those in authority to act with care.

Since disagreements were among employees inevitable, the plurality's rule "invites discipline, rather than further discussion, when such disputes arise." In conclusion, he said, the First Amendment "requires that, before firing a public employee for her speech, management get its facts straight."

== Subsequent jurisprudence ==
The next term, in United States v. National Treasury Employees Union, a 6–3 Court held unconstitutional Section 501(b) of the Ethics Reform Act of 1989 (Pub. L. 101–194), which barred all federal employees from accepting compensation for making speeches or writing for publication. Stevens, writing for the majority, distinguished the case from Waters and its predecessors by noting that it involved a broadly applied instance of prior restraint instead of a disciplinary action against a single employee for actual speech. Following Waters he found the government's predictions of disruption if the statute were overturned unwarranted.

O'Connor wrote a separate concurrence noting that this case was an instance of the limits on deference to the government as employer she had recognized in Waters. "As the magnitude of intrusion on employees' interests rises, so does the Government's burden of justification ... In this case ... the Government has exceeded the limits of its latitude". Chief Justice William Rehnquist, writing for the dissenters, argued that the majority overemphasized the Waters test at the expense of the balancing of individual and government interests required by Pickering.

=== Heffernan v. City of Paterson ===
While the Court heard other cases concerning the First Amendment rights of public employees, it would not revisit Waters until Heffernan v. City of Paterson in 2016. There, a New Jersey police detective sued his employer after he was demoted to patrol work due to a mistaken belief that he was supporting an opposing candidate in the city's mayoral election. "In Waters, the employer reasonably but mistakenly thought the employee had not engaged in protected speech," Justice Stephen Breyer wrote, distinguishing the two cases. "Here, the employer mistakenly thought the employee had ...."

Since, in Waters, the Court had concluded that the employer's intent was what mattered, Breyer argued Heffernan should be decided the same way. "In law, what's sauce for the goose is sauce for the gander," he wrote. Breyer and five other justices held for Heffernan that his discipline violated constitutional rights he had not exercised.

=== Appeals courts ===
Waters has also been cited many times by lower courts. At the appellate level, there have been several notable cases where it has factored into the analysis, sometimes helping to decide the case, and in others allowing judges to develop aspects of the holding in greater depth. Two cases concerned academic freedom and political correctness. Others involved same-sex marriage and satanic ritual abuse.

==== Academic freedom cases ====
===== Jeffries v. Harleston =====
The Waters decision had an immediate effect on a case arising from an academic controversy in New York. Following a 1991 speech making assertions that Jews sponsored the slave trade and controlled the media, Leonard Jeffries, chairman of the African-American studies department at the City College of New York (CCNY), was terminated from the chairmanship prior to the end of his three-year term by the City University of New York (CUNY) trustees although he retained his professorship. CUNY administrators claimed they did so for other reasons unrelated to the speech. He sued, was awarded damages, and the Second Circuit upheld the verdict in 1993.

After Waters, the university petitioned the Supreme Court for certiorari. The Supreme Court told the Second Circuit to reconsider the case in light of that holding. In 1995, the Second Circuit reversed its original ruling, finding that under Waters the college could have reasonably considered Jeffries' speech disruptive enough to justify adverse action. Judge Joseph M. McLaughlin interpreted Waters to hold, relevant to the Jeffries case, "that the closer the employee's speech reflects on matters of public concern, the greater must be the employer's showing that the speech is likely to be disruptive before it may be punished".

The first appellate decision had held that the university had failed to show actual disruption to its operations by the speech. "Waters pulls a crucial support column out from under our earlier Jeffries opinion", McLaughlin wrote, by lowering the requirement to demonstrate only the likelihood. Since the jury had found that a majority of the CUNY trustees voted to end his chairmanship for that reason, his First Amendment rights had not been abridged. McLaughlin also rejected an argument in an amicus brief that Jeffries' academic freedom deserved greater protection than Churchill's, since he was tenured and retained his professorship.

===== Burnham v. Ianni =====
In fall 1991 two students in the History Club at the University of Minnesota Duluth had the idea to photograph professors in the history department with props that represented their specialties for a display near the department offices. Albert Burnham, the club's advisor and a specialist in American military history, wore a coonskin cap while brandishing a .45-caliber military pistol. Ronald Marchese, who specialized in classical antiquity, was photographed with an ancient Roman sword and laurel wreath. A month after the display was installed, the university's chancellor, Lawrence Ianni, ordered the two photographs removed after complaints from female administrators and faculty, some of whom had been targeted by an anonymous public harassment campaign that year over Ianni's establishment of a Commission on Women. The professors and students sued, and won partial summary judgement holding that Ianni did not have qualified immunity. The defendants cited Waters, but Judge Michael J. Davis ruled that it was not relevant since the case did not involve an adverse employment action.

The Eighth Circuit reversed on appeal. Theodore McMillian relied on Waters to give weight to the chancellor's fears of disruption in light of the harassment campaign, noting that "It cannot seriously be disputed that, during that spring 1992 semester, the atmosphere on campus was more tense than normal." C. Arlen Beam rejected that analysis in his dissent, saying those fears were "based on conclusory hearsay and rank speculation".

An en banc rehearing in turn reversed that panel. Beam reiterated his arguments in the majority opinion. McMillian, dissenting along with John R. Gibson, who had joined him in the original panel, wrote that the majority had understated the effect of the harassment on the campus in assessing the potential for disruption. Despite the lack of adverse action, it was "no less an employment-related case" than Waters and its related cases, he argued. Ianni, who they felt had qualified immunity in any event due to the lack of settled law where academic freedom was concerned, had had to make a choice between two subordinates' conflicting interests. The messages conveyed by the photographs could clearly have been conveyed through other means, they observed.

==== Shahar v. Bowers ====
Waters was also part of the analysis employed in Shahar v. Bowers, an Eleventh Circuit case brought against Georgia Attorney General Mike Bowers by a woman to whom he had withdrawn a job offer after learning of her plans for a lesbian wedding in 1991, saying it would reflect badly on his office in public opinion to have an employee whose lifestyle involved regularly violating Georgia law against sodomy. After Northern District of Georgia senior judge Richard Cameron Freeman granted Bowers summary judgement on her First and Fourteenth Amendment claims, she appealed. A three-judge panel agreed her right to intimate association had been violated and remanded to have that claim considered under a strict scrutiny standard.

In a partial concurrence with John Cooper Godbold's holding, Judge Phyllis A. Kravitch looked to Waters, then a new decision. Its lower constitutional standard for the government as employer led her to conclude that the Pickering balancing test should be applied to the intimate-association claim rather than strict scrutiny, as the district court had done. "[T]he employer's assessment of harm" she wrote, "should be discounted by the probability of its realization in order to weigh it fairly against an actual burden on an employee's constitutional rights. This was in keeping with circuit precedent regarding Connick.

A petition for rehearing en banc was granted in late 1995. In writing for a majority that upheld the district court absolutely, Judge J.L. Edmondson applied the Pickering test as Kravitch had argued. He cited Waters as requiring "substantial weight" be given to the concerns of Bowers and his senior aides that Shahar's wedding ceremony would reflect adversely on his office and its ability to fulfill its duties. Therefore, they did not have to make "a particularized showing of interference with the provision of public services" as Shahar argued.

Three of the four dissenting judges took up Waters. In a dissent joined by Godbold, Kravitch responded that while it did require great deference to public-employer concerns, neither did it require "that courts must accept blindly all claims of harm conjured by government employers" since they could evaluate whether they were reasonable or not. Shahar, she observed, wasn't claiming her marriage was a legally-recognized one, and had been discreetly held in another state with no media attention, which Bowers should have known before rescinding the job offer. Therefore, his adverse action was unreasonable and "his predictions regarding intra-office strife do not weigh very heavily in the balance."

Judge Stanley Birch went even further in his dissent, also joined by Kravitch and Godbold. In the wake of the Supreme Court's Romer v. Evans holding that homosexuals as a class were entitled to at least some rights under the Equal Protection Clause, he argued that all of Bowers' fears of disruption under Waters ultimately arose from her status as a lesbian and were thus not a legitimate basis for state action.."

Rosemary Barkett accused the majority of using Waters to effect a "wholesale restructuring of Pickering". The only issue in Waters, she wrote, had been whether to decide the case on the basis of what the employer reasonably believed was said or what a jury found was said. Like Birch and Kravitch, she found that case supported Shahar's position, since she did not find Bowers' investigation reasonable. "Waters asserts Pickering's principles and reiterates the necessity for constitutionally enforced processes to protect the rights of government employees."

==== Wright v. Illinois Dept. of Children & Family Services ====
A few months after Waters was handed down, back in the Seventh Circuit, Judge Joel Martin Flaum made it part of a two-fold test with Connick in Wright v. Illinois Department of Children & Family Services, a complicated case in which a child-welfare worker accused her employer of retaliating against her after she complained it was covering up evidence of satanic ritual abuse she had found. He read it as making clear that "not every utterance by a public employee, even if entitled to First Amendment protection in another context, is constitutionally shielded from employer discipline." As a result, the case considered only the speech for which the plaintiff had been disciplined, and held that in one instance the defendants would prevail if they showed their belief that she had perjured herself in court testimony was reasonable even if the testimony later was found to be truthful. (Note: A Tenth Circuit panel also considered this possibility in a later case (Deutsch v. Jordan, 618 F.3d 1093, 1102, note 3 (10th Cir., 2010)), but came to the conclusion it did not need to decide it for lack of jurisdiction.)

After an extensive analysis finding that truthful trial testimony was protected speech, which culminating in find a genuine factual dispute on the issue and thus overturning the summary judgement initially granted by the district court, Flaum echoed one of Scalia's criticisms in a footnote. "Waters provides little direct guidance as to the division of labor between judge and jury in a case like this one," he observed. "The critical question that, to this point, remains unanswered requires an assessment of the defendants' subjective motivation, a classic jury issue."

==== Other appellate cases ====
In 1999, the Second Circuit considered Lewis v. Cowen, a case in which the former director of the Connecticut Lottery claimed his dismissal for not speaking violated his First Amendment rights. The appellant was dismissed after refusing to prepare changes to the lottery he had privately expressed reservations about. Without any actual speech to apply the Pickering–Connick tests to, Judge John Walker held that behavior fell under Waters since it adversely affected the lottery's operations. "In such a case, the agency may terminate the employee because a more compliant subordinate who agrees to publicly support and convey the agency's positions would allow the agency to do the job more effectively."

Waters forced the Third Circuit to no longer require that public employers show actual disruption. In Watters v. Philadelphia, it overturned summary judgment against the administrator of a police department's employee assistance program who had told a local newspaper there was a "crisis" in the program due to the lack of key official policies, and been fired. "Disruption caused by actions independent of the speech at issue cannot be equated with disruption caused by the speech itself", wrote Dolores Korman Sloviter.

The Sixth Circuit found Waters very similar to a 2006 case it heard, Farhat v. Jopke. A Michigan school custodian fired after a long history of abusive communications with administrators and his union, which sometimes included threats of violence, was found to have engaged in unprotected speech. "[E]ven if portions of appellant's expression did address matters of public concern," wrote William Bertelsman, "the disruptiveness of his speech in the workplace outweighed any value his expression might have had."

=== Analysis and commentary ===
Advocates for public employees, particularly in education, were dismayed by Waters. "Incredibly, this decision seems to abandon truth as a criterion for decision making and substitutes for it a belief be it true or false as long as it was established by reasonable means" wrote George Madden of Montana State University Billings, echoing Scalia's complaint. He also felt the case raised privacy concerns not touched on in the opinion since Churchill and Perkins-Graham had apparently believed they could speak freely. However, Madden cautioned, this would depend on how lower courts interpreted the case.

A.N. Moshirnia sees Waters as a further erosion, along with Mt. Healthy and Connick, of the rights of educators affirmed in Pickering, which "may have indicated the zenith of First Amendment protection for public employee speech." After the later cases imposed some other barriers to a public-employee plaintiff, Waters, Moshirnia said, "dramatically reduced the government's trial burden by permitting the government to justify its employment action with less than conclusive evidence." He also thought it could be used for prior restraint since, in his analysis, a public employer could "fire an employee before he or she has spoken in cases where the government knows the general contours of the speech, and predicts that it might cause a disruption.

Charles W. Hemingway, a Virginia federal employment lawyer, took up O'Connor's question about the unique nature of government employment that allows the lower constitutional obligation. Looking over older Supreme Court jurisprudence on the subject, he observed that "Employees who are appointed in the federal service act as agents of the sovereign and thereby accept both the powers and the obligations imposed on the sovereign itself. To enable our government to function properly and to promote the public good, federal employees must be under stricter authority of the sovereign than private citizen[s]." He found its source in the authority of the government over military personnel. While civilian employees enjoyed greater liberty than soldiers, the Court had ruled they were both under the same authority. (Note: Hemingway cites Butler v. Pennsylvania Canal Commission, 51 U.S. 402 (1850); United States v. Hartwell, 73 U.S. 385 (1867) and Blake v. United States, 103 U.S. 227 (1880).)

For most of the country's history, Hemingway wrote, federal employees were appointees, employed at will, with no legal recourse against adverse actions due to the federal government's sovereign immunity. That began to change in the late 19th century with the Pendleton Act. Over the course of the 20th century Congress expanded the protections of federal employees, to the point that by the 1990s they had the same legal recourse against discrimination as employees in the private sector, with five separate administrative agencies (Note: The Office of Personnel Management, Federal Labor Relations Authority, United States Merit Systems Protection Board, Equal Employment Opportunity Commission and the Office of Special Counsel.) empowered to hear employee complaints and grant relief.

Those rights have come with restrictions private workers are not subject to. In the late 1930s Congress passed the Hatch Act, limiting political activity by federal employees, and it has been upheld by the Supreme Court on several occasions. Federal employees, though in some cases unionized, are also not allowed to strike, a restriction upheld by a district court. (Note: United Federation of Postal Clerks v. Blount, 325 F.Supp 879 (D.D.C., 1971).) The 1978 Ethics in Government Act imposed other restrictions on federal employees that sometimes go beyond the term of their employment. Lastly, the federal government's sovereign immunity means it can only be sued where such actions are permitted by statute.

He reviewed actions of the Merit Systems Protection Board (MSPB), the administrative body that hears most claims by federal employees, and the Federal Circuit, which hears appeals from the MSPB and the other agencies, in light of Waters and United States v. National Treasury Employees Union. Recounting the differences between O'Connor and Scalia, he advised federal managers to follow O'Connor's approach pending later jurisprudence. "[I]t is clear that Waters expands federal employee due process rights while attempting to reserve for public managers the ultimate ability to determine whether public employee speech detracts from the Government's ability to perform its mission.

== See also ==
- List of United States Supreme Court cases involving the First Amendment
- List of United States Supreme Court cases, volume 511
