= Kilbourn v. Thompson =

- Supreme Court of the United States

Decided February 28, 1881
- Full case name: Hallet Kilbourn v. John G. Thompson, et al.
- Citations: 103 U.S. 168 (more) 26 L. Ed. 377

Holding
- The plea set up by those of the defendants who were members of the House is a good defence, and the judgment of the court overruling the demurrer to it and giving judgment for those defendants will be affirmed. As to Thompson, the judgment reversed and the case remanded for further proceedings.

Court membership
- Chief Justice Morrison Waite Associate Justices Nathan Clifford · Samuel F. Miller; Stephen J. Field · Joseph P. Bradley; Ward Hunt · John M. Harlan; William B. Woods

Case opinion
- Majority: Miller, joined by unanimous

Kilbourn v. Thompson, 103 U.S. 168 (1880), was a United States Supreme Court case that dealt with the question whether or not the United States House of Representatives may compel testimony.

Hallet Kilbourn was subpoenaed to testify before a Special Committee established by the House of Representatives to investigate the bankruptcy of Jay Cooke & Company. Though he appeared, he refused to answer any questions and did not tender requested documents. John G. Thompson, Sergeant-At-Arms for the House, took Kilbourn into custody. Kilbourn continued to refuse to testify and provided no explanation for his refusal. The House resolved that Kilbourn was in contempt and should be held in custody until he agreed to testify and produce the requested documents. The Court found that the House did not have the power to punish for contempt. However, House members could not be sued for false imprisonment as they were exercising their official duties and protected by the Speech and Debate Clause, Art. I, § 6, cl. 1. In addition the Supreme Court established several limits in the scope of investigations, called the "Kilbourn Test".

== The Kilbourn Test ==
- (1) Inquiries must not "invade areas constitutionally reserved to the courts or the executive"
- (2) Inquiries must deal "with subjects on which Congress could validly legislate"
- (3) The resolution authorizing the investigation must specify " a congressional interest in legislating on that subject."
- (4) Where the inquiry can result in "no valid legislation," then the "Private affairs of individuals" are not valid targets for inquiry

== See also ==
- List of United States Supreme Court cases, volume 103
- Calder v. Bull, 3 U.S. 386 (1798)
- Ex parte Milligan, 71 U.S. 2 (1866)
- United States v. Cruikshank, 92 U.S. 542 (1876)
