= Paul Bender (jurist) =

American attorney and law school dean (1933–2026)

- Paul Bender (left), Jon Kyl (center), and Andrew D. Hurwitz (right) speaking at Arizona State University

Principal Deputy Solicitor General of the United States
- In office January 1993 – November 13, 1997
- Appointed by: Drew S. Days III
- President: Bill Clinton
- Preceded by: John Roberts
- Succeeded by: Seth P. Waxman

Personal details
- Born: May 31, 1933 New York City, U.S.
- Died: September 11, 2026 (aged 93) Phoenix, Arizona, U.S.
- Education: Harvard University (BA, JD)

Paul Bender (May 31, 1933 – September 11, 2026) was an American legal scholar and dean of the Arizona State University college of law. He was formerly a professor at the University of Pennsylvania Law School. Over his career Bender argued more than 20 cases before the United States Supreme Court. He is often cited as an expert in constitutional law.

== Education ==
Bender attended James Madison High School in Brooklyn, New York, where he was a high school classmate with future Supreme Court Justice Ruth Bader Ginsburg. Bender received both his bachelor's and J.D. degrees from Harvard University. After law school Bender clerked for Judge Learned Hand of the United States Court of Appeals for the Second Circuit, then for Justice Felix Frankfurter of the U.S. Supreme Court during the 1959 Term.

== Legal career ==
After his clerkships Bender was a professor at the University of Pennsylvania Law School before becoming dean of the Arizona State University college of law in 1984. In 1965 Bender served as Assistant to U.S. Solicitors General Archibald Cox where he defended the United States in Brenner v. Manson. He later worked as General Counsel to the President's Commission on Obscenity and Pornography from 1968 until 1970. Bender served as dean of the ASU law school until 1989. In 1993, during the Bill Clinton administration, Bender was appointed Deputy Solicitor General by Drew Days. Bender continued to teach courses in constitutional law at ASU.

While Deputy Solicitor General, Bender argued several notable cases, including:

- Farmer v. Brennan (1994), in which the Court held that "deliberate indifference" to a substantial risk of serious harm to an inmate is cruel and unusual punishment.
- United States v. National Treasury Employees Union (1995), in which the Court held that section 501(b) of the Ethics in Government Act of 1978 violates the First Amendment.
- United States v. Virginia (1996), in which the Supreme Court struck down the Virginia Military Institute (VMI)'s long-standing male-only admission policy.
- United States v. Winstar Corp. (1996), in which the Court held that waivers of sovereign power generally must be surrendered in unmistakable terms.
- Bush v. Vera (1996), in which the court struck down districts in Texas for racial gerrymandering.

Other notable cases Bender has argued before the Court include:

- Arizona Christian School Tuition Organization v. Winn, representing the respondent Winn.
- Stewart v. Martinez-Villareal.

Bender was a vocal opponent of Miguel Estrada, who worked under Bender at the Solicitor General's office, when Estrada was nominated to the D.C. Circuit Court of Appeals.

== Arizona redistricting commission ==
Bender was part of the team that drafted Arizona's Proposition 106, which created the Arizona Independent Redistricting Commission in 2000. Bender subsequently sought one of the five seats on the commission. His nomination was opposed by Republicans in the state legislature and was the subject of an Arizona Supreme Court case: Adams v. Commission on Appellate Court Appointment. The court ruled that members of tribal courts, as Bender was for two Native American nations, are not "public officials" for the purpose of the redistricting commission. As a result, the court held, Bender was not ineligible to serve. Ultimately, however, he was not selected.

== Death ==
Bender died in Phoenix on September 11, 2026, at the age of 93.

== Publications ==
- Copyright and First Amendment After Eldred v. Ashcroft, 30 Colum J. L. & Arts 349 (2006)(SSRN).
- Foreword, the School Tax Credit Case - a Study in Constitutional Misinterpretation, 32 Ariz. St. L. J. 1 (2000).
- 1990 Arizona Repatriation Legislation, 24 Ariz. St. L.J. 391 (1992)(SSRN).
- Paul Bender (co-author). Political and Civil Rights in the United States (Orig. 1979; 4th Supp. 1982). Boston, Mass.: Little, Brown. ISBN 0316236276, ISBN 9780316236270.

== See also ==
- List of law clerks for the second seat of the Supreme Court of the United States
