= Betty Smith Williams =

American nurse

- Education: Case Western Reserve University
- Occupation: Nurse
- Known for: First African-American nurse to graduate from the nursing school at Case Western Reserve University
- Medical career
- Institutions: University of California, Los Angeles
- Sub-specialties: Public health nursing

Betty Smith Williams is an American nurse. Williams was the first African-American nurse to graduate from the nursing school at Case Western Reserve University (CWRU). Williams is also a co-founder of the National Black Nurses Association (NBNA).

== Biography ==
Williams earned her bachelor's degree in zoology from Howard University. Williams graduated with a doctorate from Case Western Reserve University's (CWRU) school of nursing in 1954, becoming the first black nurse to graduate from that school.

In 1956, Williams became the first Black professor at Mount Saint Mary's College, Los Angeles. It is often erroneously claimed that she was the first Black professor in the state of California, however, Professor David Blackwell was hired at the University of California, Berkeley in 1954, and then made full professor in 1955. She was hired to teach public health nursing at the University of California, Los Angeles (UCLA). In 1971, Williams was a co-founder of the National Black Nurses Association (NBNA). From 1995 to 1999, Williams was the president of NBNA. In 1980, Williams became a fellow of the American Academy of Nursing.
