= Edith Irwin Hobart =

14th President General of the Daughters of the American Revolution

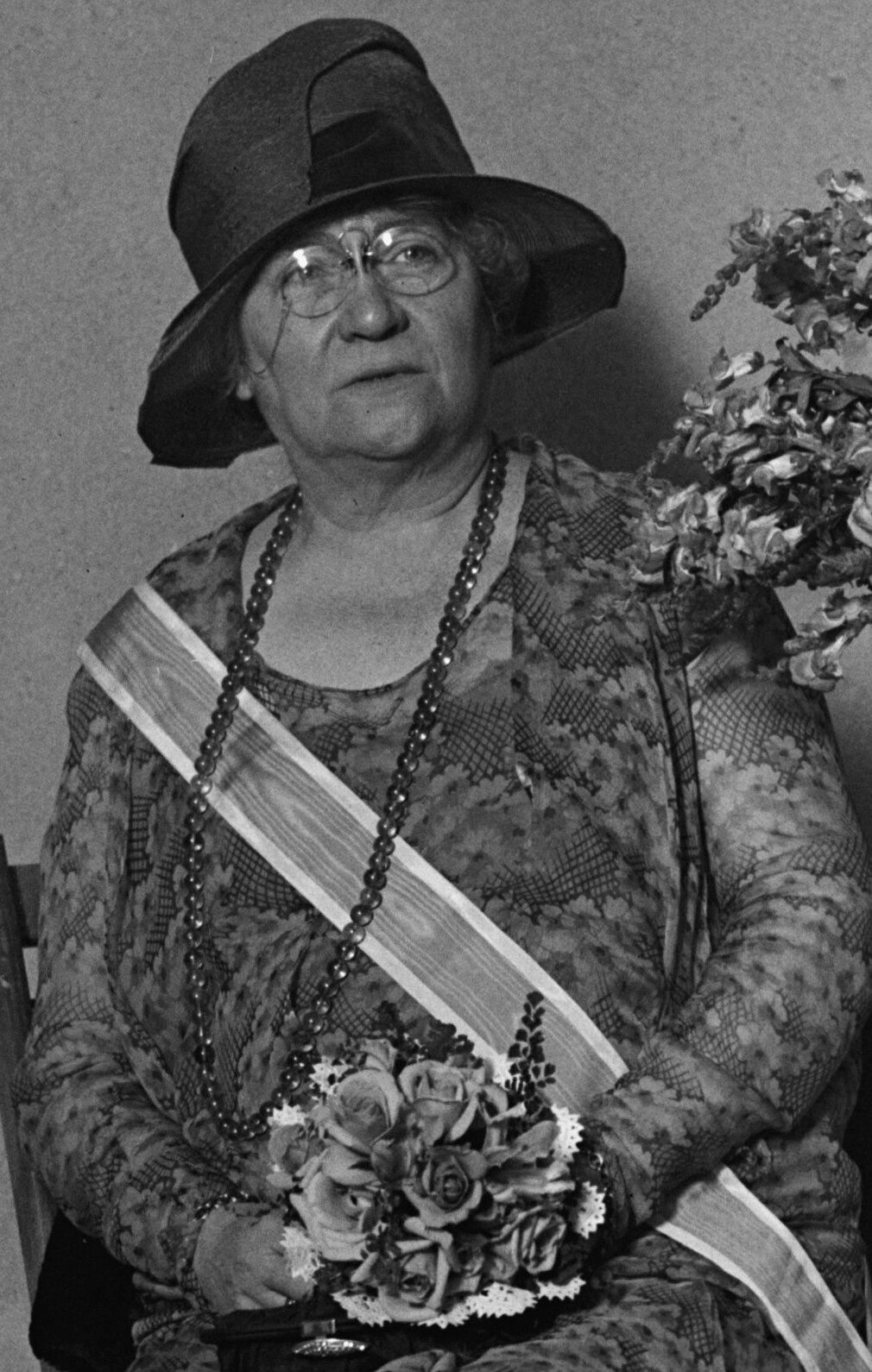
- Hobart in 1929

14th President General of the National Society Daughters of the American Revolution
- In office 1929–1932
- Preceded by: Grace Lincoln Hall Brosseau
- Succeeded by: Edith Scott Magna

1st National President of the American Legion Auxiliary
- In office 1921–1922

Personal details
- Born: Edith E. Irwin; 1869 Cincinnati, Ohio, U.S.
- Died: 1958 (aged 88–89) Cincinnati, Ohio, U.S.
- Resting place: Spring Grove Cemetery
- Spouse: Lowell Fletcher Hobart

Edith E. Irwin Hobart (1869–1958) was an American civic leader who served as the 14th president general of the Daughters of the American Revolution and as the 1st national president of the American Legion Auxiliary.

== Biography ==
Hobart joined the Cincinnati Chapter of the Daughters of the American Revolution in 1898, serving as chapter regent for three terms. She later served as the State Regent of Ohio for three years, as Organizing Secretary General, and as Chairwoman of the Buildings and Grounds Committee. She served as President General of the national society from 1929 to 1932, and during her tenure as president general, DAR Constitution Hall was completed. During her presidency, she traveled to 47 U.S. states. After her term ended, she was elected as Honorary President General.

She served as the first national president of the American Legion Auxiliary from 1921 to 1922.

She married Lowell Fletcher Hobart, a liquor salesman. Her husband died in 1913.
