= American Nurses Association =

U.S. professional organization for nurses

- Abbreviation: ANA
- Founded: February 11–12, 1897; 129 years ago
- Type: Nonprofit professional association
- Tax ID no.: 13-1893923
- Legal status: 501(c)(6)
- Purpose: To advance and promote the improvement of health standards and the standards of nursing and to stimulate and promote the professional development of nurses and advance their economic and general welfare.
- Headquarters: Silver Spring, Maryland, U.S.
- Coordinates: 38.994879°N 77.026850°W
- ANA Enterprise Chief Executive Officer: Angela Beddoe
- President: Jennifer Mensik Kennedy
- Subsidiaries: American Nurses Foundation Inc _{(501(c)(3))}, American Nurses Credentialing Center _{(501(c)(6))}, American Academy of Nursing _{(501(c)(3))}, Institute for Nursing Research and Education _{(501(c)(3))}, ANA PAC _{(PAC)} Nurse Marketplace Inc _{(For-profit)}, ANA Service Corporation Inc _{(For-profit)},
- Revenue: $45,051,913 (2017)
- Expenses: $48,000,366 (2017)
- Endowment: $315,783 _{(2017)}
- Employees: 255 (2017)
- Volunteers: 699 (2017)
- Website: www.nursingworld.org
- Formerly called: Nurses Associated Alumnae

The American Nurses Association (ANA) is a 501(c)(6) professional organization to advance and protect the profession of nursing. It started in 1896 as the Nurses Associated Alumnae and was renamed the American Nurses Association in 1911. It is based in Silver Spring, Maryland, and Jennifer Mensik Kennedy is the current president.

The ANA states nursing integrates the art and science of caring and focuses on the protection, promotion, and optimization of health and human functioning; prevention of illness and injury; facilitation of healing; and alleviation of suffering through compassionate presence. Nursing is the diagnosis and treatment of human responses and advocacy in the care of individuals, families, groups, communities, and populations in recognition of the connection of all humanity.

== History ==
=== 19th century ===
Initial organizational plans were made for the Nurses Associated Alumnae of the United States of America on September 2, 1896, at Manhattan Beach Hotel near New York City. On February 11–12, 1897, those plans were ratified in Baltimore at a meeting that coincided with the annual conference of the American Society of Superintendents of Training Schools for Nurses. Isabel Hampton Robb served as the first president. A major early goal of the organization was the enhancement of nursing care for American soldiers.

ICN was founded in 1899 by nursing organizations from Great Britain, the ANA for the United States, and Germany as charter members. The first ever ICN Congress was held in Buffalo New York in 1901.

=== 20th century ===
In 1947, the next congress, the Ninth ICN Quadrennial Congress in 1947, was held in Atlantic City, New Jersey. Attended by over 5,000 delegates representing 250,000 nurses in 32 countries, it was a major step forward in re-establishing international peacetime relations in the healthcare community. ANA leadership made all arrangements including locating lodgings for attendees among local residents, and raising funds to cover travel costs. (Note: The Farewell: When this great postwar Congress came to a close, the ties harshly strained by war had been reknit and greatly strengthened.)

In 1970, Mattiedna Johnson spoke at an ANA convention on the lack of representation of African American nurses. She believed it was a major issue which led to the founding of National Black Nurses Association in 1971.

=== 21st century ===
In February 2022, ANA partnered with Congresswoman Deborah Ross and Congressman Dave Joyce on the Sexual Assault Nurse Examiners (SANEs) Act, which is designed to address the nationwide shortage of Sexual Assault Nurse Examiners (SANEs) and improve care for survivors of sexual violence. The bill was also endorsed by RAINN and the National Network to End Domestic Violence.

== Mission ==
The association is a professional organization representing registered nurses (RNs) in the United States through its 54 constituent member associations. The ANA is involved in establishing standards of nursing practice, promoting the rights of nurses in the workplace, advancing the economic and general welfare of nurses.

Statements by ANA have been featured in publications arguing against mandatory nurse-to-patient ratios. The American Nurses Association says it has "real concerns about the establishment of fixed nurse-to-patient ratio numbers."

The ANA also has three subsidiary organizations, the American Academy of Nursing, formed to serve the public and nursing profession by advancing health policy and practice through the generation, synthesis, and dissemination of nursing knowledge, the American Nurses Foundation, the charitable and philanthropic arm, and the American Nurses Credentialing Center, which credentials nurses in their specialty and credentials facilities that exhibit nursing excellence.

== Publications ==
- American Nurse Today
- The American Nurse
- OJIN: The Online Journal of Issues in Nursing

== Members ==
- Katharine Jane Densford, president 1944–48; testified before Congress during World War II regarding wartime nursing recruitment
- Lavinia Dock, nursing educator, public health advocate, author, and suffragist
- Mary Keys Gibson, involved in desegregation efforts in 1948
- Mary Eliza Mahoney, a founder of the former National Association of Colored Graduate Nurses in 1908
- Helen Maria Roser, nursing educator, worked for ANA's Professional Counseling & Placement Service, 1945 to 1953
- M. Elizabeth Shellabarger, Wyoming State Nurses' Association, president
- Vera Blanche Thomas, Arizona State Nurses' Association, president 1927-28

== See also ==
- American Association of Legal Nurse Consultants
- American Nurses Association Hall of Fame
