= Mary Keys Gibson =

American nurse (1854–1952)

- Gibson in 1952
- Born: Mary Keys; 1854; Mississippi, US
- Died: 1952 (aged 98)
- Education: Chautauqua School of Nursing
- Occupations: Midwife, nurse
- Known for: Civil rights activism

Mary Keys Gibson (also Gipson, 1854–1952) was an American nurse. Gibson, a former enslaved person, worked as a midwife for many years and later earned her degree in nursing in 1907 at age 53. Gibson was the first African American to earn an accredited nursing degree in the Southern United States. She helped desegregate nursing as a profession.

== Biography ==
Gibson was born in Mississippi in 1854 and was an enslaved person. As a young person, she was asked to tend to the sick and injured on the plantation where she was enslaved. After the Civil War, she and her family moved to Sherman, Texas. She met her husband, Reverend Franklin Gibson, in Sherman and the couple moved to Fort Worth in 1872. Together, they helped found what became the Carter Metropolitan CME Church. Mary Gibson worked as a midwife and her husband encouraged her to get a degree in nursing.

Gibson attended a correspondence school, the Chautauqua School of Nursing because segregated school in Texas did not offer degrees in nursing at the time. When she graduated at age 53 in 1907, she became the first African American person in the Southern United States to earn an accredited nursing certificate. In 1909, she lobbied the Texas legislature to pass educational and licensing standards for nursing. Gibson worked to desegregate nursing as a profession. She was involved in 1948 to help desegregate the American Nurses Association.

Gibson died in 1952 at the age of 98.
