= Edith Bolte MacCracken =

American clubwoman and civic leader

- Born: February 16, 1869; Chicago, Illinois, U.S.
- Died: April 1946 (aged 77)
- Occupations: Clubwoman, civic leader
- Spouse: Samuel Gordon MacCracken (m. 1900)
- Children: 3

Edith Maude Marie Bolte MacCracken (February 16, 1869 – April 1946) was an American clubwoman and civic leader.

== Early life ==
Edith Maude Marie Bolte was born on February 16, 1869, in Chicago, the daughter of William Henry Bolte and Jane Usher Baker.

== Career ==
Edith Bolte MacCracken was president of the Ashland Civic Club; president of the District Federation of Women's Clubs; State Regent of the Daughters of the American Revolution.

She was a member of the Order of the Eastern Star and the General Society of the War of 1812.

From 1934 to 1935 she was the president of the American Legion Auxiliary to the Jackson County Medical Society. In April 1935 she conducted a survey to collect biographical data of Jackson County physicians from 1850 to 1935.

== Personal life ==
Edith Bolte MacCracken moved to Oregon in 1916 and lived in Ashland, Oregon.

On March 15, 1900, in Chicago, she married Dr. Samuel Gordon MacCracken, the vice-president of the Jackson County Medical Society in 1924, and had three children: Chester Caldwell, Charles Gordon, Elliott Bolte.

She died in April 1946.

== Legacy ==
The Edith Bolte MacCracken Collection on the History of the Physicians of Jackson County, 1935-1946 is hosted at Oregon Health & Science University, Historical Collections & Archives.
