= Edith Scott Magna =

15th President General of the Daughters of the American Revolution

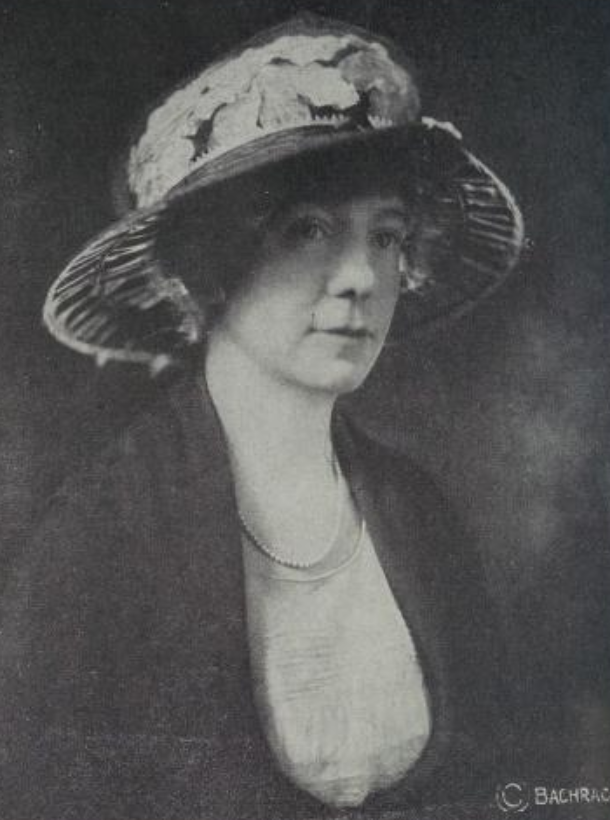
- Edith Scott Magna, from a 1920 publication

15th DAR President General, National Society Daughters of the American Revolution
- In office 1932–1935
- Preceded by: Edith Irwin Hobart
- Succeeded by: Florence Hague Becker

Personal details
- Born: November 15, 1885
- Died: October 19, 1960 (aged 74) Holyoke, Massachusetts, U.S.
- Spouse: Russell William Magna
- Education: Smith College (BA)

Edith Scott Magna (November 15, 1885 – October 19, 1960) was an American civic leader who served as the 15th president general of the Daughters of the American Revolution (DAR).

== Early life and education ==
Magna was born on November 15, 1885. She was the daughter of Colonel Walter Scott, a businessman and philanthropist for whom the Scott Medal was named, and Sarah Dean Campbell. She graduated with a bachelor of arts degree from Smith College in 1909.

== Music ==
Magna was a soprano singer who specialized in Scottish songs. She also wrote songs and poems.

== Clubwork ==
Magna was vice-president general of the National Society Daughters of the American Revolution (DAR) in the 1920s, and served as the DAR's president general from 1932 to 1935. She made it official that presidents general should visit all of the states during their term, and was the first president general to travel by plane to state conferences. During the Great Depression, before her presidency, she raised funds to furnish the library at Memorial Continental Hall.

In 1927, a bronze plaque was installed to mark Magna's work in preserving Crafts Tavern, the old post tavern in Holyoke, Massachusetts. (The tavern was demolished by 1950, but the plaque was displayed in the school that was built in its place.) The Massachusetts chapter of the DAR funded a college scholarship in her name in 1939. She commented on the honor in 1940, "Faith in our schools is faith in our youth. They need us in these serious times, even as we need them."

Magna was made a knight of the Legion of Honour. She was a member of the National Society Colonial Dames XVII Century and the Mayflower Society. A building at Clarke School in Northampton was named for her.

== Personal life ==
Scott married Russell William Magna on March 28, 1910. After being hospitalized for a month following a hip fracture, she died on October 19, 1960, in Holyoke, Massachusetts.
