= American Legion Auxiliary =

American nonprofit organization

- Emblem
- Established: November 10, 1919 (106 years ago)
- Founded at: Minneapolis, Minnesota
- Type: Patriotic service organization
- Headquarters: 3450 Founders Road, Indianapolis, Indiana
- Region served: Worldwide
- Official language: English
- National President: Pam Ray
- National Vice President: Dr. Coral May Grout
- Executive Director: Ben Hendricks
- Publication: Auxiliary Magazine
- Affiliations: The American Legion; Sons of The American Legion; American Legion Riders
- Website: alaforveterans.org

The American Legion Auxiliary (ALA) is a separate entity from The American Legion that shares the same values. It is composed of spouses, mothers, fathers, daughters, sons, granddaughters, grandsons, brothers, and sisters of American war veterans. Founded in 1919, the ALA is dedicated to serving veterans, military, and their families.

== History ==
After the formation of The American Legion in 1919, a number of women's organizations wanted to become the official affiliation of The American Legion. The women who had provided service and support to the soldiers fighting in World War One wanted to continue to do so. After careful consideration, the committee agreed that a new organization should be made up of the women most closely associated with the men of the Legion, and that these women would serve with the Legion, in peace as they had in war.

The committee decided to build a new organization from the ground up, so the Auxiliary could then carry forward the phases of Legion activities more suitably performed by women. Edith Irwin Hobart served as the Auxiliary's first president. In less than one year, 1,342 local units of the Women's Auxiliary to The American Legion had been organized in more than 45 states.

== Eligibility ==
In 2019, the American Legion's National Convention voted to replace the word "wife" with "spouse" in the organization's constitution and bylaws section regarding eligibility to be a member of the American Legion Auxiliary; since then, male and female spouses of U.S. veterans have been eligible. Previously, only female spouses of U.S. veterans were.

== Programs ==
The American Legion Auxiliary's mission outreach committees are Americanism, Children and Youth, Community Service, Education, ALA Girls Nation, Junior Activities, Legislative, National Security, Poppy, and Veterans Affairs and Rehabilitation.

ALA members who work these programs help provide scholarships to military children; bring veterans to classrooms; give young women leaders an opportunity to learn how the federal government works; allow girls to develop leadership skills through volunteer experiences and other activities; advocate for veterans by supporting legislative priorities that benefit them; promote the poppy to raise awareness and respect for veterans who have died; and host stand downs and other events to improve the lives of veterans in the community.

In 1954, the American Legion Auxiliary organized "Operation Book Swap" in which hardcover books were handed out to children in exchange for turning in ten comic books. This was largely a response to the publication and publicity of Fredric Wertham's book Seduction of the Innocent. The collected comics were then publicly burned or destroyed.

== Notable Members ==
- Julia McGehee Alexander
- Cora M. Beach
- Othilia Carroll Beals
- Edith Irwin Hobart
- Cecile Brawley Long
- Edith Bolte MacCracken
- Sara E. Morse
- Isabel Neill
- M. Elizabeth Shellabarger
- Rachel Applegate Solomon
- Zatae Leola Longsdorff Straw
- May Erwin Talmadge
- Vera Blanche Thomas
