= Florence Hague Becker =

American clubwoman (1886–1971)

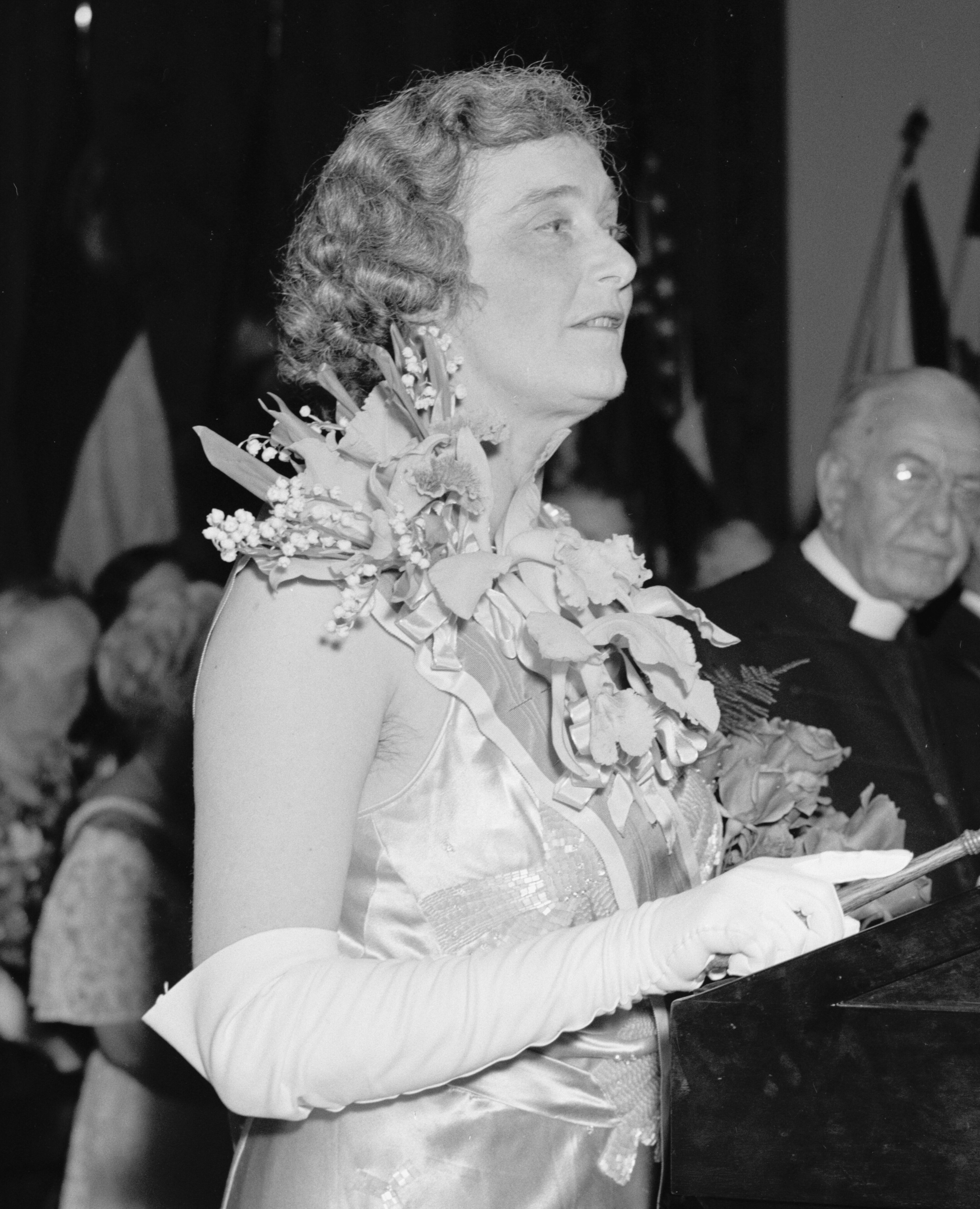
- Becker in 1938

16th President General, Daughters of the American Revolution
- In office 1935–1938
- Preceded by: Edith Scott Magna
- Succeeded by: Sarah Corbin Robert

Personal details
- Born: April 23, 1886 Westfield, New Jersey, U.S.
- Died: July 16, 1971 (aged 85) Volusia County, Florida, U.S.
- Spouse: William A. Becker
- Education: Smith College

Florence A. Hague Becker (April 23, 1886 – July 16, 1971), also known as Mrs. William A. Becker, was an American philanthropist and anti-communist activist who served as the 16th president general of the National Society of Daughters of the American Revolution (DAR). As president general, she led the DAR through the Great Depression, raising funds to pay its employees sufficiently. She used her position to speak out against communism and the socialist movement.

== Early life and education ==
Becker was the daughter of Ainsworth James Hague and Susan Baker Hague of Newark, New Jersey. Her father was the head of A. J. Hague, a lace importing business in New York. She had two brothers, Ainsworth Becker Hague Jr. and Francis Baker Hague. She grew up in Westfield, New Jersey. Becker attended Smith College, graduating in 1909. While a student at Smith, she was in charge of all supplies sent to the Smith Relief Unit in France during World War I.

== Daughters of the American Revolution ==
In 1915, Becker joined the Nova Caesarea Chapter of the DAR in Newark. She served as regent of the Nova Caesarea Chapter and later, from 1926 to 1929, served as New Jersey State Regent. She served on the DAR Constitution Hall Committee and as National Chairwoman of the National Defense through Patriotic Education Committee. During her time leading the Patriotic Education Committee, US Representative John W. McCormack called on her to compile a report on alleged communist propaganda being distributed to American youth. being distributed to young Americans by various groups. She spoke out against communism and the information revealed by her report. She believed that the DAR had an obligation to encourage Americans to "study, learn, and understand what liberty means."

In 1935, Becker was elected national president general of the DAR. As president bgeneral, she continued to speak out against communism and societal challenges that she believed pushed American citizens to support the socialist movement. In 1936, when addressing the DAR at their 45th Continental Congress in Washington, D.C., she discussed the need for local governments to cure societal problems including "starvation wages, unequal opportunity, uncertainty of justice, neglect of youth, lynchings, and malfeasance in office."

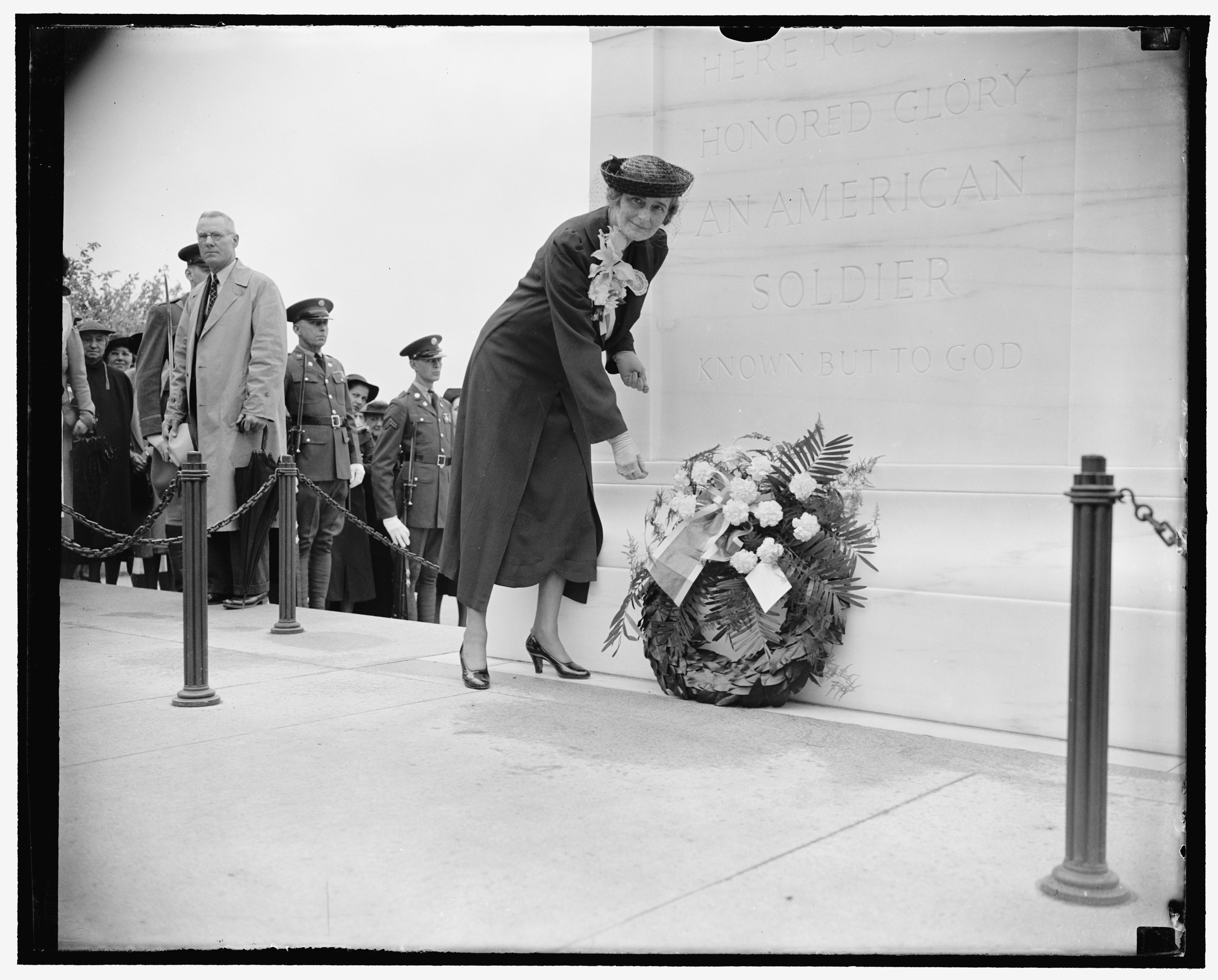
Becker places a wreath at the Tomb of the Unknown Soldier in Arlington National Cemetery in 1938

She led the national society through the Great Depression, overseeing the restoration of employee salaries to pre-Depression levels, developing an employee retirement fund, eliminating unnecessary spending, and securing a reserve fund. She developed programs that focused on children's educational and nutritional needs, including "Becker Boys and Girls", which provided students with clothes, food, and transportation to and from school. Under her direction, DAR chapters worked with the Boy Scouts of America and Girl Scouts of the USA to facilitate summer camps. Her administration distributed scholarships to women studying home economics.

In 1937, she went on an official tour of Europe. While in Germany, she led the Berlin-based Dorothea von Steuben Chapter in a commemorative marker ceremony honoring Baron Friedrich Wilhelm von Steuben's service during the American Revolutionary War. In France, she participated in the 100th-anniversary celebration of the Arc de Triomphe, accompanied by the Benjamin Franklin Chapter of Paris, spoke at Memorial Day events, and placed a wreath at the Tomb of the Unknown Soldier at the Somme American Cemetery and Memorial. Becker was received by Pope Pius XI in the Vatican City and was presented to King George VI and Queen Mary at the Buckingham Palace in London.

After leaving office, she was elected Honorary President General in 1938.

== Personal life ==
She became engaged to William A. Becker on October 20, 1918. They later married. She died on July 16, 1971 (aged 85).

== Legacy ==
Florence H. Becker Recreation Hall in Marshall County, Alabama, built in 1937 and added to the National Register of Historic Places in 2003, was named in her honor.
