= Sarah Corbin Robert =

American authority on parliamentary procedure (1886–1972)

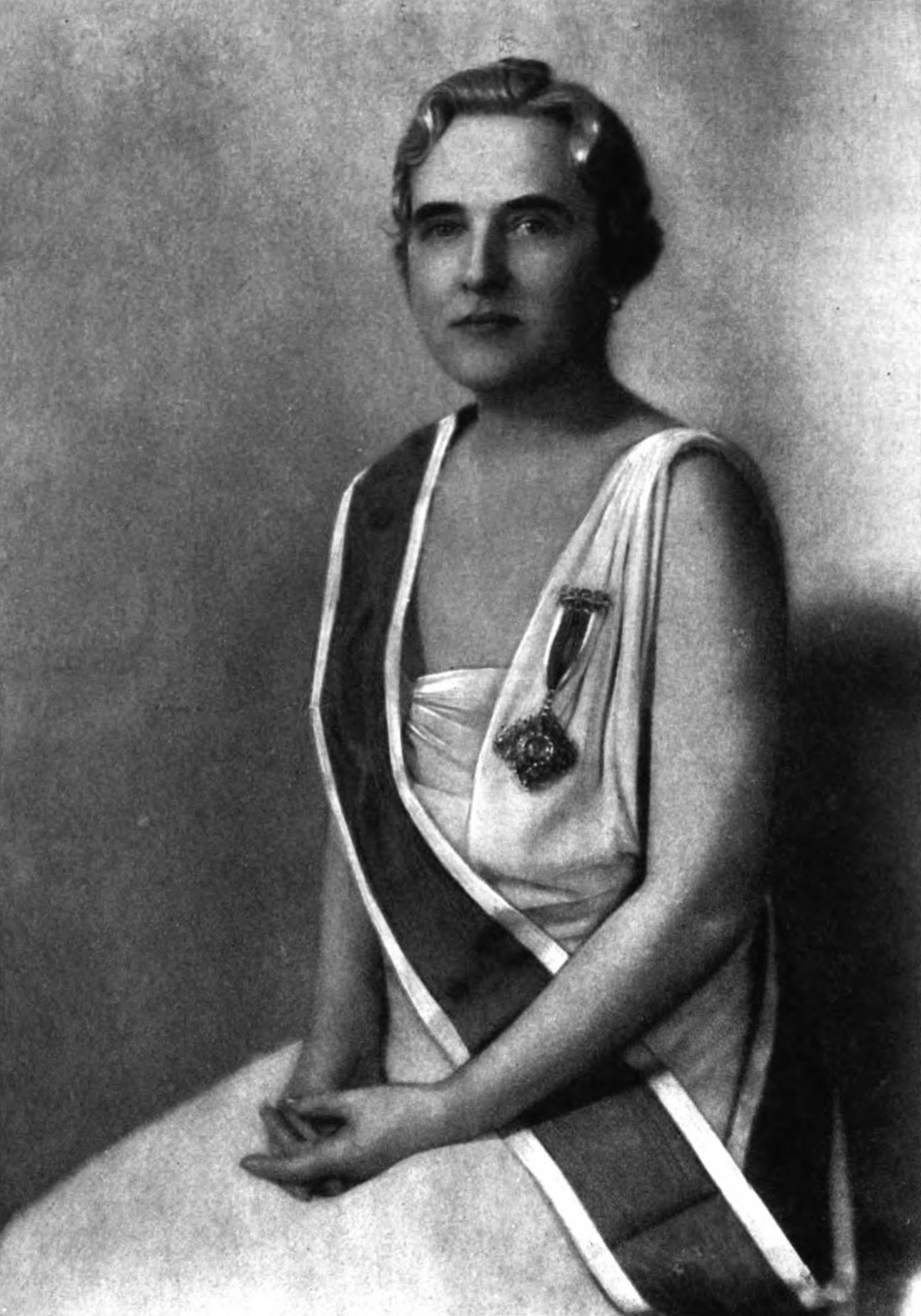

17th DAR President General, National Society Daughters of the American Revolution
- In office 1938–1941
- Preceded by: Florence Hague Becker
- Succeeded by: Helena R. Pouch

Personal details
- Born: August 26, 1886; Pennsylvania, U.S.
- Died: May 1, 1972 (aged 85); Annapolis, Maryland, U.S.
- Resting place: Saint Anne's Cemetery
- Spouse: Henry Martyn Robert Jr.
- Children: 1
- Parent(s): William Wallace Corbin; Emma Flora Hamilton
- Education: Syracuse University
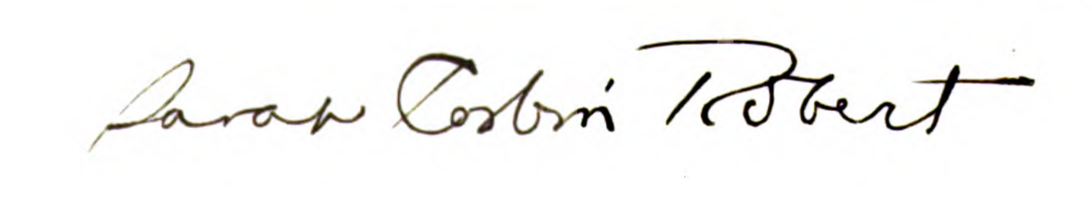
- Signature

Sarah Emily Corbin Robert (August 26, 1886 – May 1, 1972) served as the 17th President General of the Daughters of the American Revolution and was a noted authority on parliamentary procedure.

== Personal life ==
Sarah was born on 26 August 1886 in Pennsylvania, the daughter of William Wallace Corbin and Emma Flora Hamilton. She married Henry Martyn Robert Jr., son of Henry Martyn Robert and Helen M Thresher, on 26 August 1919 in Tioga County, New York. Their son was Henry Martyn Robert III. She died on 1 May 1972 in Annapolis, Maryland and is buried at Saint Anne's Cemetery.

== Education and professional life ==
She graduated from Owego Free Academy in 1905, and Syracuse University in 1909. Robert taught American History in New York and New Jersey high schools for a decade. She was an authority on parliamentary procedure, teaching courses on parliamentary law at Columbia University, the University of Maryland, and The United States Naval Academy. She holds the honorary degree of Doctor of Literature.

She served as a trustee for Robert’s Rules of Order, whose creator, Henry Martyn Robert, was her father-in-law. She was head of the authorship team for the 7th edition, printed in 1970.

== DAR membership ==
Robert joined the Stewart Tea Party Chapter in 1921, where she soon served in a variety of roles, including Chapter Regent. She also served as Maryland State Recording Secretary, as national chairman on Patriotic Education (1926–1929), as chairman of the Credentials Committee (1931–1934), and as Treasurer General (1935-1938). She was an advocate for both DAR Schools and standardization and simplification of DAR publications and practices, such as registration at Continental Congress.

=== DAR President General Administration ===
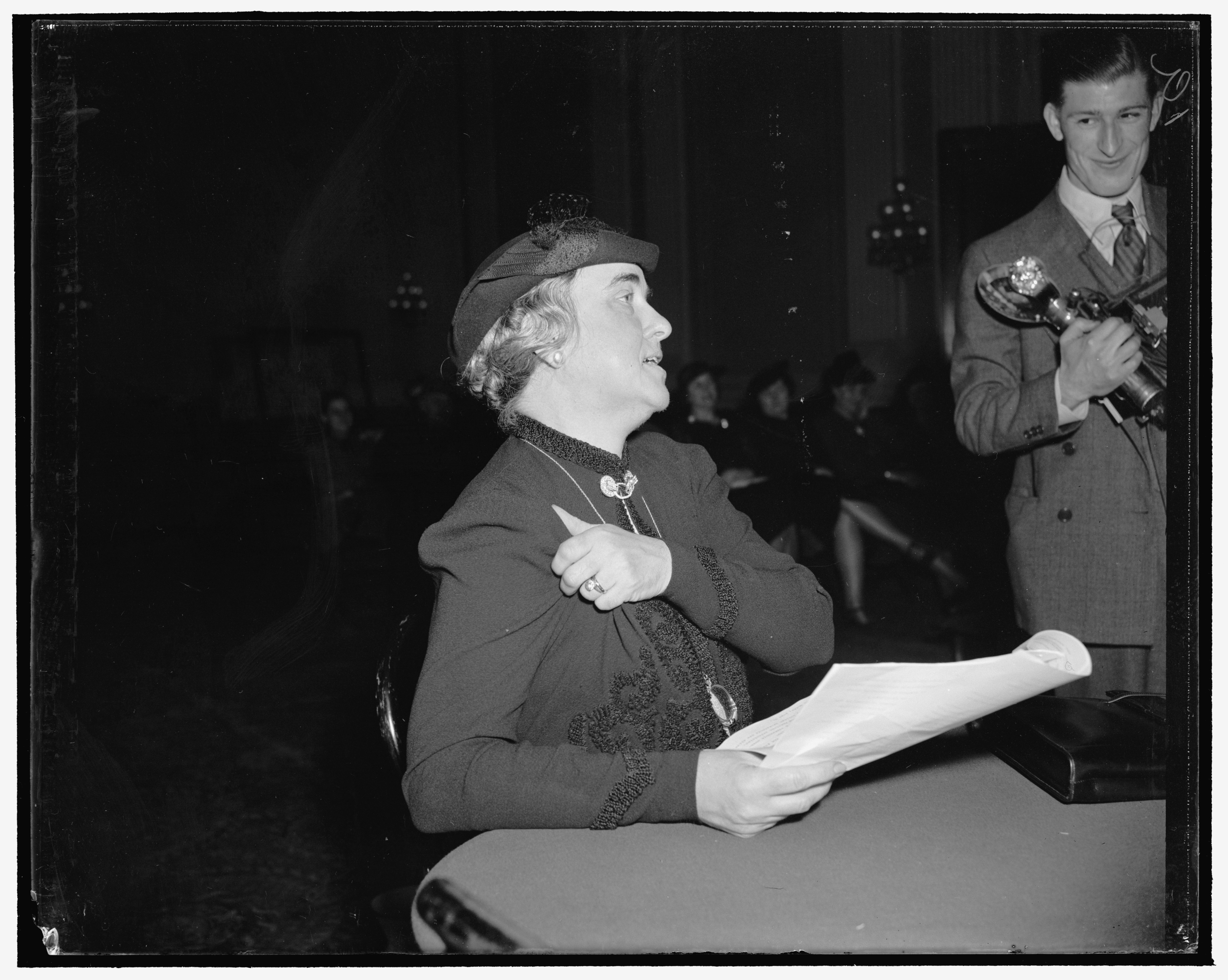
Robert in 1938

==== The Golden Jubilee Administration ====
Robert was elected DAR President General in 1938, having run unopposed. The DAR celebrated its 50th anniversary during the Robert administration. Projects overseen by Roberts include funding for a new high-school facility at Tamassee DAR School, which would be completed in 1942 and named for her, the continuation of the Penny Pines project to replant thousands of acres of trees in national forests, and the Valley Forge Bell Tower project at Washington Memorial Chapel in the Valley Forge National Historical Park, which installed 17 new bells.). She also represented the DAR at the 1939 World’s Fair in New York City. With war on the horizon, Robert initiated War Relief Service Committees and encouraged chapter partnership with the American Red Cross.

==== Marian Anderson controversy ====
In 1939 Robert personally denied the use of DAR Constitution Hall to the famous black contralto Marian Anderson. Anderson was singing as part of a concert series in Washington being organized by Howard University. Her fame required a large venue and the DAR Hall was the largest in the city. However, Robert cited segregation laws and longstanding agreements regarding segregation among D.C. performance venues as the reason for the denying use of the Hall. The concert was instead held at the Lincoln Memorial on the National Mall in Washington, but the DAR's decision created a backlash, including the resignation of First Lady Eleanor Roosevelt from the organization. Four years later, in 1942, the DAR invited Anderson to perform in Constitution Hall in the Army Emergency Relief Fund concert series hosted there. Negotiations resulted in that concert being integrated, but Anderson was unsuccessful in negotiating for the promise of future integrated events. Anderson went on to perform at Continental Hall in 1953 and 1956, and the DAR awarded her the Centennial Medal in 1992 for outstanding service to the nation.

== Other associations ==
- Daughters of Founders and Patriots of America
- Daughters of Colonial Wars
- National Society of the Colonial Dames of America
- General Federation of Women's Clubs
- Association for Preservation of Virginia Antiquities
