= National Black Nurses Association =

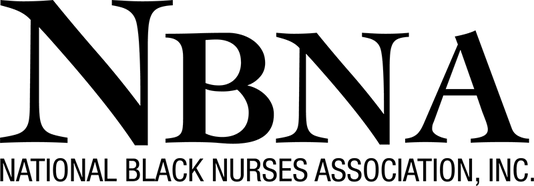
- Abbreviation: NBNA
- Formation: 1971; 55 years ago
- Founder: Betty Smith Williams
- Founded at: Cleveland, Ohio
- Type: Organization
- Purpose: Promoting African American women in the profession of nursing
- Members: 200,000 (2020)
- Main organ: Journal of the NBNA
- Website: Official website

The National Black Nurses Association (NBNA) was founded in 1971 in Cleveland, Ohio. It was incorporated on September 2, 1972. The organization is dedicated to promoting African American women in the profession of nursing.

== History ==
At the American Nurses Association (ANA) Convention in 1970, 200 African-American nurses proposed the formation of the National Black Nurses Association (NBNA). After the convention, several nurses met at Doctor Mary Harper's home in Cleveland, Ohio to discuss the formation of an organization. The group was organized in December 1971. Betty Smith Williams was the nurse who proposed the formation of the group under its current name. It was co-founded by Mattiedna Johnson. The first president of NBNA was Doctor Lauranne Sams. In 1972, the organization was officially incorporated. By 1991, there were 51 chapters of the organization around the United States.

Williams served as president from 1995 to 1999.

The goal of the NBNA is to improve the health status of black people in the United States, Canada, Eastern Caribbean, and Africa and to open nursing education and leadership positions for African Americans. The official mission statement was to provide a forum for collective action by black nurses to investigate, define and advocate for the health care needs of African Americans and to implement strategies that ensure access to health care, equal to, or above health care standards of the larger society.

The NBNA has hosted "NBNA Day on Capitol Hill" since 1988. At the event, nursing professionals share ways to advocate for nursing and for their communities.

The official journal of the NBNA is the Journal of the NBNA.

As of 2024, there are around 308,000 members of NBNA and 111 chapters.
