= Isabel Neill =

Isabel Lois Perry Neill (November 12, 1896 in Washington – February 12, 1978 in Yakima, Washington) was a newspaper writer.

== Early life ==
Isabel Lois Perry Neill was born in 1896, the daughter of William Alan Perry (born in 1854) and Marie Strachey.

== Career ==
She was a newspaper writer. She contributed verse and children's stories to several magazines of national circulation.

She was a member of the Woman's Century Club and the American Legion Auxiliary.

== Personal life ==
Isabel Neill moved to Yakima, Washington in 1921 and lived at 913 Broadway. She married Paul Neill.
