= American Nurses Foundation =

U.S. non-profit organization

The American Nurses Foundation is the non-profit philanthropic and charitable arm of the American Nurses Association. Through several programs such as Nurses on Boards, the Post Traumatic Stress Disorder (PTSD) Toolkit, Nursing Research Grants program, among many others, the Foundation is known for its dedication to "Transform the nation's health through the power of nursing", which is its mission statement. The Foundation is located in Silver Spring, Maryland, and is currently chaired by Joyce J. Fitzpatrick.

== History ==
The Foundation was created in 1955 as an affiliate of the American Nurses Association (ANA) with a focus on charitable and educational endeavors. It engages in fundraising and management of grants to support these goals. Since its inception, the Foundation has grown to include programs ranging in diversity from research grants and scholarships to the Nurses on Boards, the PTSD Toolkit, and Disaster Relief, among other programs dedicated to completing the Foundation's mission.

The Foundation's most well-established program remains the nursing research grants (NRG) program. As the primary founding purpose for the Foundation, more than 950 researchers have benefited from contributions to the Foundation's NRG program, allowing for extraordinary contribution to science and medicine. In 2014 alone, the Foundation awarded over $247,400 to twenty-five scholars.

== Programs supported by the Foundation ==
- Nurses On Boards
- PTSD Toolkit
- Leadership Institute
- Disaster Relief
- HealthyNurse
- Shift Work
- Nursing Research Grants
- Scholarship
- Institute of Medicine Scholar
- Washington Policy Fellowship
