= Vera Blanche Thomas =

American registered nurse

Vera Blanche Thomas (born March 19, 1903) was a graduate registered nurse.

== Early life ==
Vera Blanche Thomas was born in Omaha, Nebraska, on March 19, 1903.

== Career ==
Thomas confined exclusively to Professional Nursing; she was president of the District No. 2, Arizona State Nurses Association from 1925 to 1926; she was president of the Arizona State Nurses' Association from 1927 to 1928.

In 1941, she was State Child Welfare chairman of the American Legion Auxiliary.

In October 1951, representing Pima County Tuberculosis and Health Association, she presided at the closing session of the Conference in Tuberculosis Nursing sponsored by the Arizona State Nurses' Association, the Arizona League of Nursing Education, the Arizona Tuberculosis and Health Association and the Arizona State Department of Health. Thirty nursing supervisors and public health nurses from 11 Arizona communities participated to the conference.

She was a member of the Daughters of the American Revolution.

== Personal life ==
Thomas lived in Chicago, Illinois, and moved to Arizona in 1921. She lived at 1601 North Stone Ave., Tucson, Arizona.

She married John Henry Thomas and had one daughter, Mary Catherine.
