= Neal v. Delaware =

- Supreme Court of the United States

Argued Mar. 21-22, 1881 Decided May 2, 1881
- Full case name: Neal v. Delaware
- Citations: 103 U.S. 370 (more)

Holding
- The Fifteenth Amendment invalidated provisions of state constitutions limiting suffrage to whites, and other privileges restricted to voters cannot be restricted based on race.

Court membership
- Chief Justice Morrison Waite Associate Justices Nathan Clifford · Samuel F. Miller; Stephen J. Field · Joseph P. Bradley; Ward Hunt · John M. Harlan; William B. Woods

Case opinions
- Majority: Harlan, joined by unanimous
- Concurrence: Waite
- Concurrence: Field

Laws applied
- U.S. Const. amend. XV

Neal v. Delaware, 103 U.S. 370 (1881), was a United States Supreme Court case in which the court held that the Fifteenth Amendment invalidated provisions of state constitutions limiting suffrage to whites, and other privileges restricted to voters cannot be restricted based on race.

== Description ==
The Delaware Constitution restricted voting to "free white male citizens, of the age of twenty-two years and upwards." Delaware law restricted jury participation to its voting population. Accordingly, Delaware considered only white people for its trial of Neal, a Black man accused of rape. That jury convicted Neal.

The Supreme Court vacated Neal's conviction and invalidated that portion of the Delaware Constitution, saying it was "beyond question" that the Fifteenth Amendment required that result.
