= List of United States Supreme Court cases, volume 103 =

Supreme Court of the United States
- Interactive map of Supreme Court of the United States
- 38°53′26″N 77°00′16″W
- Established: March 4, 1789; 236 years ago
- Location: Washington, D.C.
- Coordinates: 38°53′26″N 77°00′16″W
- Composition method: Presidential nomination with Senate confirmation
- Authorised by: Constitution of the United States, Art. III, § 1
- Judge term length: life tenure, subject to impeachment and removal
- Number of positions: 9 (by statute)
- Website: supremecourt.gov

This is a list of cases reported in volume 103 of United States Reports, decided by the Supreme Court of the United States in 1880 and 1881.

== Justices of the Supreme Court at the time of volume 103 U.S. ==
The Supreme Court is established by Article III, Section 1 of the Constitution of the United States, which says: "The judicial Power of the United States, shall be vested in one supreme Court . . .". The size of the Court is not specified; the Constitution leaves it to Congress to set the number of justices. Under the Judiciary Act of 1789 Congress originally fixed the number of justices at six (one chief justice and five associate justices). Since 1789 Congress has varied the size of the Court from six to seven, nine, ten, and back to nine justices (always including one chief justice).

When the cases in volume 103 U.S. were decided the Court comprised nine of the following ten members at one time (William Burnham Woods replaced William Strong in January 1881):

Portrait	Justice	Office	Home State	Succeeded	Date confirmed by the Senate (Vote)	Tenure on Supreme Court
	Morrison Waite	Chief Justice	Ohio	Salmon P. Chase	January 21, 1874 (63–0)	March 4, 1874 – March 23, 1888 (Died)
	Nathan Clifford	Associate Justice	Maine	Benjamin Robbins Curtis	January 12, 1858 (26–23)	January 21, 1858 – July 25, 1881 (Died)
	Noah Haynes Swayne	Associate Justice	Ohio	John McLean	January 24, 1862 (38–1)	January 27, 1862 – January 24, 1881 (Retired)
	Samuel Freeman Miller	Associate Justice	Iowa	Peter Vivian Daniel	July 16, 1862 (Acclamation)	July 21, 1862 – October 13, 1890 (Died)
	Stephen Johnson Field	Associate Justice	California	newly created seat	March 10, 1863 (Acclamation)	May 10, 1863 – December 1, 1897 (Retired)
	William Strong	Associate Justice	Pennsylvania	Robert Cooper Grier	February 18, 1870 (No vote recorded)	March 14, 1870 – December 14, 1880 (Retired)
	Joseph P. Bradley	Associate Justice	New Jersey	newly created seat	March 21, 1870 (46–9)	March 23, 1870 – January 22, 1892 (Died)
	Ward Hunt	Associate Justice	New York	Samuel Nelson	December 11, 1872 (Acclamation)	January 9, 1873 – January 27, 1882 (Retired)
	John Marshall Harlan	Associate Justice	Kentucky	David Davis	November 29, 1877 (Acclamation)	December 10, 1877 – October 14, 1911 (Died)
	William Burnham Woods	Associate Justice	Georgia	William Strong	December 21, 1880 (39–8)	January 5, 1881 – May 14, 1887 (Died)

== Notable Cases in volume 103 U.S. ==
=== Kilbourn v. Thompson ===
Kilbourn v. Thompson, 103 U.S. 168 (1880) dealt with whether the United States House of Representatives may compel testimony. The Supreme Court held that the chamber has the power to punish persons for contempt if they refuse to obey a summons from the House.

=== Neal v. Delaware ===
In Neal v. Delaware, 103 U.S. 370 (1881), the Supreme Court, with a majority opinion by Justice John Marshall Harlan, vacated the guilty verdict and death sentence on an African-American man accused of rape. In selecting persons to serve as jurors, no persons of color were in the jury pool, but rather were excluded because of their race though they were otherwise qualified. The Court held this to violate Neal's rights under the 14th Amendment. Neal was acquitted in a second trial that included black men in the jury pool but not on the trial jury. Neal has been cited by appellate courts more than 200 times, including by the Court in the 2019 case Flowers v. Mississippi.

== Citation style ==
Under the Judiciary Act of 1789 the federal court structure at the time comprised District Courts, which had general trial jurisdiction; Circuit Courts, which had mixed trial and appellate (from the US District Courts) jurisdiction; and the United States Supreme Court, which had appellate jurisdiction over the federal District and Circuit courts—and for certain issues over state courts. The Supreme Court also had limited original jurisdiction (i.e., in which cases could be filed directly with the Supreme Court without first having been heard by a lower federal or state court). There were one or more federal District Courts and/or Circuit Courts in each state, territory, or other geographical region.

Bluebook citation style is used for case names, citations, and jurisdictions.

- "C.C.D." = United States Circuit Court for the District of . . .
  - e.g.,"C.C.D.N.J." = United States Circuit Court for the District of New Jersey
- "D." = United States District Court for the District of . . .
  - e.g.,"D. Mass." = United States District Court for the District of Massachusetts
- "E." = Eastern; "M." = Middle; "N." = Northern; "S." = Southern; "W." = Western
  - e.g.,"C.C.S.D.N.Y." = United States Circuit Court for the Southern District of New York
  - e.g.,"M.D. Ala." = United States District Court for the Middle District of Alabama
- "Ct. Cl." = United States Court of Claims
- The abbreviation of a state's name alone indicates the highest appellate court in that state's judiciary at the time.
  - e.g.,"Pa." = Supreme Court of Pennsylvania
  - e.g.,"Me." = Supreme Judicial Court of Maine

== List of cases in volume 103 U.S. ==
Case Name	Page and year	Opinion of the Court	Concurring opinion(s)	Dissenting opinion(s)	Lower Court	Disposition
Annapolis and Elk Ridge Railroad Company v. Anne Arundel County	1 (1881)	Waite	none	none	Md.	affirmed
Hall v. Wisconsin	5 (1880)	Swayne	none	none	Wis.	reversed
Dennick v. Central Railroad of New Jersey	11 (1881)	Miller	none	none	C.C.N.D.N.Y.	reversed
Prewit v. Wilson	22 (1881)	Field	none	none	C.C.N.D. Ala.	reversed
Insurance Company v. Stinson	25 (1881)	Bradley	none	none	C.C.D. Mass.	affirmed
Folger v. United States	30 (1881)	Harlan	none	Field	Ct. Cl.	affirmed
Bamberger v. Terry	40 (1881)	Waite	none	none	C.C.D. Conn.	affirmed
Pennock v. Commissioners	44 (1881)	Field	none	none	Kan.	affirmed
Congress and Empire Spring Company v. Knowlton	49 (1881)	Woods	none	Harlan	C.C.N.D.N.Y.	affirmed
Mitchell v. Overman	62 (1881)	Harlan	none	none	C.C.S.D. Ohio	affirmed
Stout v. Lye	66 (1881)	Waite	none	none	C.C.N.D. Ohio	affirmed
United States v. Hough	71 (1880)	Miller	none	none	C.C.W.D. Tenn.	affirmed
Wall v. Monroe County	74 (1881)	Field	none	none	C.C.E.D. Ark.	affirmed
Allen v. Louisiana	80 (1881)	Waite	none	none	C.C.E.D. Mo.	affirmed
Jones v. Van Benthuysen	87 (1881)	Miller	none	none	C.C.D. La.	reversed
Boogher v. New York Life Insurance Company	90 (1880)	Waite	none	none	C.C.E.D. Mich.	affirmed
National Bank of Genesee v. Whitney	99 (1881)	Field	none	none	N.Y. Sup. Ct.	rehearing denied
Cucullu v. Hernandez	105 (1881)	Woods	none	none	C.C.D. La.	affirmed
Railroad Companies v. Schutte	118 (1881)	Waite	none	none	C.C.N.D. Fla.	affirmed
City of Chicago v. Tilley	146 (1881)	Woods	none	none	C.C.N.D. Ill.	affirmed
Tilley v. Cook County	155 (1881)	Woods	none	none	C.C.N.D. Ill.	affirmed
Chicot County v. Lewis	164 (1881)	Bradley	none	none	C.C.E.D. Ark.	affirmed
Kilbourn v. Thompson	168 (1881)	Miller	none	none	Sup. Ct. D.C.	multiple
Barney v. Latham	205 (1881)	Harlan	none	none	C.C.D. Minn.	reversed
Wilmot v. Mudge	217 (1881)	Miller	none	none	Mass. Super. Ct.	affirmed
Relfe v. Rundle	222 (1881)	Waite	none	none	C.C.D. La.	reversed
Blake v. United States	227 (1881)	Harlan	none	none	Ct. Cl.	affirmed
Ex parte Burtis	238 (1881)	Waite	none	none	E.D.N.Y.	mandamus denied
The Benefactor	239 (1881)	Bradley	none	none	C.C.E.D.N.Y.	reversed
Sharp v. Dover Stamping Company	250 (1881)	Woods	none	none	C.C.D. Mass.	reversed
Weightman v. Clark	256 (1881)	Waite	none	none	C.C.S.D. Ill.	affirmed
Oscanyan v. Winchester Repeating Arms Company	261 (1881)	Field	none	none	C.C.S.D.N.Y.	affirmed
Bondurant v. Watson I	278 (1881)	Waite	none	none	La.	dismissed
Bondurant v. Watson II	281 (1881)	Woods	none	none	C.C.D. La.	affirmed
Louisiana v. United States	289 (1881)	Waite	none	none	C.C.E.D. Mo.	affirmed
Barbour v. Priest	293 (1881)	Miller	none	none	C.C.N.D. Ohio	reversed
The Illinois	298 (1881)	Waite	none	none	C.C.E.D. Pa.	affirmed
Moyer v. Dewey	301 (1881)	Miller	none	none	N.Y.	affirmed
Miles v. United States	304 (1881)	Woods	none	none	Sup. Ct. Terr. Utah	reversed
Bartlett Land and Lumber Company v. Saunders	316 (1881)	Bradley	none	none	C.C.D.N.H.	affirmed
Ward v. Todd	327 (1881)	Waite	none	none	C.C.E.D. Ark.	affirmed
Bouldin v. Alexander	330 (1880)	Waite	none	none	Sup. Ct. D.C.	reversed
Blake v. McKim	336 (1881)	Harlan	none	none	C.C.D. Mass.	affirmed
Weitzel v. Rabe	340 (1881)	Waite	none	none	C.C.S.D. Ohio	affirmed
Webber v. Virginia	344 (1881)	Field	none	none	Va.	reversed
Mechanics' and Traders' Insurance Company v. Kiger	352 (1881)	Waite	none	none	C.C.D. La.	affirmed
Wolff v. City of New Orleans	358 (1881)	Field	Harlan	none	C.C.D. La.	reversed
Neal v. Delaware	370 (1881)	Harlan	none	Waite; Field	Del. O. and T.	reversed
Coddington v. Pensacola and Georgia Railroad Company	409 (1881)	Miller	none	none	C.C.N.D. Fla.	affirmed
Lincoln Township v. Cambria Iron Company	412 (1881)	Bradley	none	none	C.C.W.D. Mich.	affirmed
Wilson v. Gaines	417 (1881)	Waite	none	none	Tenn.	affirmed
Seven Hickory Township v. Ellery	423 (1881)	Waite	none	none	C.C.S.D. Ill.	affirmed
Saint Joseph and Denver City Railroad Company v. Baldwin	426 (1881)	Field	none	none	Neb.	reversed
Fisk v. Arthur	431 (1881)	Waite	none	none	C.C.S.D.N.Y.	affirmed
New York Life Insurance Company v. Bangs	435 (1881)	Field	none	none	C.C.D. Minn.	affirmed
Terry v. McLure	442 (1881)	Miller	none	none	C.C.D.S.C.	affirmed
Jones v. Walker	444 (1881)	Miller	none	none	C.C.D. Ky.	affirmed
Unity Township v. Burrage	447 (1881)	Woods	none	none	C.C.S.D. Ill.	affirmed
Wicke v. Ostrum	461 (1881)	Waite	none	none	C.C.S.D.N.Y.	affirmed
Edwards v. United States	471 (1881)	Bradley	none	none	C.C.W.D. Mich.	affirmed
Thompson v. United States	480 (1881)	Bradley	none	none	C.C.W.D. Mich.	affirmed
Kern v. Huidekoper	485 (1881)	Woods	none	none	C.C.N.D. Ill.	affirmed
Dietzsch v. Huidekoper	494 (1881)	Woods	none	none	C.C.N.D. Ill.	affirmed
Morgan County v. Allen	498 (1881)	Harlan	none	none	C.C.S.D. Ill.	affirmed
Allen v. Morgan County	515 (1881)	Harlan	none	none	C.C.S.D. Ill.	affirmed
Little Rock Waterworks Company v. Barret	516 (1881)	Miller	none	none	C.C.E.D. Ark.	affirmed
Green v. Fisk	518 (1881)	Waite	none	none	C.C.D. La.	dismissed
Louisiana v. City of New Orleans	521 (1880)	Waite	none	none	La.	advancement denied
Dennison v. Alexander	522 (1880)	Waite	none	none	Sup. Ct. D.C.	dismissed
Tipton County v. Rogers Locomotive and Machine Works	523 (1881)	Harlan	none	none	C.C.W.D. Tenn.	affirmed
The Richmond	540 (1880)	Waite	none	none	C.C.D. La.	affirmed
Northwestern Mutual Life Insurance Company v. Nelson	544 (1881)	Woods	none	none	C.C.D. Kan.	reversed
Dubuclet v. Louisiana	550 (1881)	Waite	none	none	C.C.D. La.	affirmed
Wayne County v. Kennicott	554 (1881)	Waite	none	none	C.C.S.D. Ill.	reversed
Ouachita County v. Wolcott	559 (1881)	Miller	none	none	C.C.E.D. Ark.	reversed
Harter v. Kernochan	562 (1881)	Harlan	none	none	C.C.S.D. Ill.	affirmed
Ashburner v. California	575 (1881)	Waite	none	none	Cal.	affirmed
Jarrolt v. Town of Moberly	580 (1881)	Field	none	Harlan	C.C.W.D. Mo.	affirmed
Adam v. Norris	591 (1881)	Miller	none	none	C.C.D. Cal.	affirmed
United States v. Quigley	595 (1881)	Waite	none	none	Ct. Cl.	affirmed
Swan v. Arthur	597 (1881)	Waite	none	none	C.C.S.D.N.Y.	affirmed
Kennedy v. City of Indianapolis	599 (1881)	Waite	none	none	C.C.D. Ind.	affirmed
Babbitt v. Clark	606 (1881)	Waite	none	none	C.C.N.D. Ohio	affirmed
Hoyt v. Sprague	613 (1881)	Bradley	none	none	C.C.D.R.I.	affirmed
Williams v. Louisiana	637 (1881)	Miller	none	none	La.	affirmed
Durkee v. Louisiana	646 (1881)	Miller	none	none	C.C.D. La.	affirmed
Bonham v. Needles	648 (1881)	Harlan	none	none	C.C.S.D. Ill.	affirmed
Wardell v. Union Pacific Railroad Company	651 (1881)	Field	none	none	C.C.D. Neb.	affirmed
Peck v. Collins	660 (1881)	Bradley	none	none	N.Y.	affirmed
St. Louis Smelting and Refining Company v. Kemp	666 (1880)	Waite	none	none	Sup. Ct. D.C.	re-docketed
Schaumburg v. United States	667 (1881)	Waite	none	none	C.C.E.D. Pa.	affirmed
Milwaukee National Bank v. City Bank of Oswego	668 (1881)	Miller	none	none	C.C.N.D.N.Y.	reversed
McCarthy v. Provost	673 (1881)	Waite	none	none	C.C.D. La.	dismissed
Yates v. National Home for Disabled Volunteer Soldiers	674 (1881)	Harlan	none	none	C.C.E.D. Wis.	affirmed
Arthur v. Jacoby	677 (1881)	Waite	none	none	C.C.S.D.N.Y.	affirmed
Thacher's Distilled Spirits	679 (1881)	Miller	none	none	C.C.S.D.N.Y.	affirmed
Walnut Township v. Wade	683 (1881)	Woods	none	none	C.C.N.D. Ill.	affirmed
Ohio v. Frank	697 (1881)	Woods	none	none	C.C.N.D. Ill.	affirmed
The Civilta	699 (1881)	Waite	none	none	C.C.S.D.N.Y.	affirmed
Philadelphia and Baltimore Central Railroad Company v. United States	703 (1881)	Miller	none	none	Ct. Cl.	affirmed
District of Columbia v. Cluss	705 (1881)	Field	none	none	Sup. Ct. D.C.	affirmed
School District v. Insurance Company	707 (1881)	Miller	none	none	C.C.D. Neb.	reversed
The Connecticut	710 (1881)	Waite	none	none	C.C.E.D.N.Y.	affirmed
Penniman's Case	714 (1881)	Woods	none	none	R.I.	affirmed
Pacific Mail Steamship Company v. United States	721 (1881)	Miller	none	none	Ct. Cl.	multiple
The Adriatic	730 (1881)	Waite	none	none	C.C.S.D.N.Y.	striking testimony denied
German National Bank v. Kimball	732 (1881)	Miller	none	none	C.C.N.D. Ill.	affirmed
Humphrey v. Baker	736 (1881)	Waite	none	none	C.C.E.D. Mich.	dismissed
Folsom v. Dewey	738 (1881)	Waite	none	none	Sup. Ct. Terr. Utah	reversed
Grinnell v. Chicago, Rock Island and Pacific Railroad Company	739 (1881)	Miller	none	none	Iowa	affirmed
Jasper County v. Ballou	745 (1881)	Waite	none	none	C.C.S.D. Ill.	affirmed
Williams v. Claflin	753 (1881)	Waite	none	none	C.C.D.S.C.	supersedeas modified
The Connemara	754 (1881)	Waite	none	none	C.C.D. La.	dismissal denied
Indiana and Illinois Central Railway Company v. Sprague	756 (1881)	Woods	none	none	C.C.D. Ind.	affirmed
Hinckley v. Morton	764 (1881)	Waite	none	none	C.C.S.D. Ill.	affirmed
Clark v. Killian	766 (1881)	Harlan	none	none	Sup. Ct. D.C.	affirmed
Whitsitt v. Railroad Company	770 (1881)	Waite	none	none	not indicated	dismissed
Wilson County v. Third National Bank of Nashville	770 (1881)	Woods	none	none	C.C.M.D. Tenn.	affirmed
New York Life Insurance Company v. Bangs	780 (1881)	Field	none	none	C.C.D. Minn.	affirmed
Central National Bank v. Royal Insurance Company	783 (1881)	Waite	none	none	C.C.S.D.N.Y.	affirmed
Hopkins and Dickinson Manufacturing Company v. Corbin	786 (1881)	Woods	none	none	C.C.D. Conn.	affirmed
Cook v. Lillo	792 (1881)	Waite	none	none	C.C.D. La.	affirmed
Ex parte Des Moines and Minneapolis Railroad Company	794 (1881)	Waite	none	none	C.C.D. Iowa	mandamus denied
Crouch v. Roemer	797 (1881)	Waite	none	none	C.C.D.N.J.	affirmed
Johnston v. Laflin	800 (1881)	Field	none	none	C.C.E.D. Mo.	affirmed
Thompson v. Perrine	806 (1881)	Harlan	none	none	C.C.S.D.N.Y.	affirmed
Buffalo and Jamestown Railroad Company v. Falconer	821 (1881)	Bradley	none	none	N.Y. Sup. Ct.	affirmed
Brown v. Slee	828 (1881)	Waite	none	none	C.C.D. Iowa	affirmed
Richmond Mining Company of Nevada v. Eureka Consolidated Mining Company	839 (1881)	Waite	none	none	C.C.D. Nev.	affirmed
