= Helen Maria Roser =

American nurse

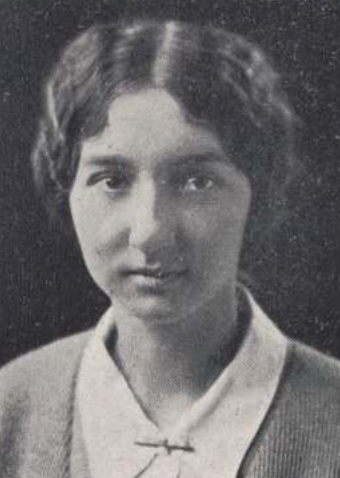
- Helen Maria Roser, from the 1925 yearbook of Mount Holyoke College
- Born: January 6, 1903; Glastonbury, Connecticut
- Died: March 16, 1992 (aged 89); Hartford, Connecticut
- Occupations: Nurse, nursing educator, textbook author

Helen Maria Roser (January 6, 1903 – March 16, 1992) was an American nurse and nursing educator. She was associate director of the Hartford Hospital School of Nursing, and co-author of an anatomy and physiology textbook for nurses.

== Early life and education ==
Roser was from Glastonbury, Connecticut, the daughter of Herman Roser and Maria Ursula Heim Roser. Both of her parents were immigrants from Germany; her father was president of a tannery, and her mother was a founding member of the Visiting Nurses Association in Glastonbury. Helen Roser graduated from Mount Holyoke College in 1925. She earned a nursing degree from Columbia University School of Nursing and a master's degree from Teachers College, Columbia University.

== Career ==
Roser was a nurse and nursing educator. She was head nurse at the Columbia-Presbyterian Medical Center in New York, and taught nursing courses at Columbia University. She was co-author of Anatomy and physiology laboratory manual and study guide (1939, 1943, 1948), with Barry Griffith King; the textbook went through several editions in the 1940s. During World War II, she was director of nursing education at the Institute of Living, a psychiatric facility in Hartford. She was assistant executive secretary of the American Nurses Association's Professional Counseling and Placement Service from 1945 to 1953, based at ANA's headquarters in Maryland. In 1947, she spoke at the annual meeting of the National Association of Colored Graduate Nurses, in Atlanta.

She was associate director of the Hartford Hospital School of Nursing in Connecticut from 1953 until she retired in 1968. In retirement, she was active with the Visiting Nurses Association, the Women's Board of Hartford Seminary, and the Campfire Girls.

== Personal life ==
Roser died in 1992, in Hartford, aged 89 years.
