= American Association of Legal Nurse Consultants =

- Formation: 1989
- Headquarters: Chicago, Illinois
- Location: United States
- Executive Director: Marisa Streelman
- Website: www.aalnc.org

The American Association of Legal Nurse Consultants (AALNC) is a non-profit organization. According to the AALNC, its mission is the professional enhancement and growth of registered nurses practicing in the specialty area of legal nurse consulting and its advancement.

Founded in 1989, AALNC provides networking opportunities, educational advancement, professional development and support certification through the American Legal Nurse Consultant Certification Board (AALNCCB). The American Association of Legal Nurse Consultants is aligned with the American Nurses Association and the American Bar Association.

== Legal nurse consultants ==
Legal nurse consultants are licensed, registered nurses who perform a critical analysis of clinical and administrative nursing practice, healthcare facts and issues and their outcomes for the legal profession, healthcare professions, consumers of healthcare and legal services, and others as appropriate. They are qualified to assess adherence to standards and guidelines of healthcare practice as it applies to the nursing and healthcare professions. The primary role of the legal nurse consultant is to evaluate, analyze, and render informed opinions on the delivery of health care and the resulting outcomes.
