= Mattiedna Johnson =

African American nurse and laboratory technician

- Born: April 7, 1918; Mississippi
- Died: December 2003 (aged 85)
- Education: Jane Terrell Memorial Hospital School of Nursing; Northwest Institute of Medical Technology
- Occupations: Nurse; laboratory technician
- Known for: Work on developing penicillin and treating scarlet fever

Mattiedna Johnson (7 April 1918 – December 2003) was an African American nurse and laboratory technician. In the 1940s, she played a pertinent role in the cure for the fatal scarlet fever epidemic and other diseases that soldiers in World War II were getting. Johnson was the only African American, nurse, and laboratory technician that worked on the U.S. Army Medical Corp penicillin project at the University of Minnesota. Johnson said she received no credit for her work on penicillin. Johnson co-founded the National Black Nurses Association, in 1971. She wrote The Penicillin Project Diary Notes and Tots Goes to Gbarnga, a self-published autobiography.

== Early life ==
Mattiedna Johnson was born to sharecroppers in Mississippi on April 7, 1918. She weighed 3 and a half pounds at birth and was the fifth child to be born in her family. With concern about his daughter's low birth weight, Johnson's father pleaded to God to provide her a healthy life in exchange for her living to serve. Her father drove Johnson to pursue a career in health care. His goal for her was to be a medical missionary in Africa. Johnson grew up with a mother who did not like girls and a father who called her Tots. She went on and published a biography later in her life called Tots Goes to Gbarnga.

== Personal life ==
Johnson got divorced after 36 years of a turmoil marriage. In 1959, she moved to Cleveland, Ohio after visiting there as a part of a missionary to save troubled churches around the United States. In Cleveland, Johnson worked as a nurse and wrote about discrimination that she was facing there. She was a part of the American Nurses Association throughout her career as a nurse. She stated that she was denied registration for the Private Duty Registry at the 1961 Ohio Nurses Association convention. She was presenting a speech about the racism that she faces as an African American nurse in Ohio. Johnson also served as a medical missionary in Liberia, Africa where she advocated the Liberian National Nursing Association. While in Africa, she taught courses at the College of West Africa. In a continued effort to advocate for Black nurses, Johnson became an active member of both the Congressional Black Caucus Health Braintrust and the 21st Congressional District Caucus in Ohio.

== Education ==
Mattiedna Johnson was awarded the title of salutatorian from her high school. She received her first degree from Jane Terrell Memorial Hospital School of Nursing in Memphis, Tennessee. She received her Registered Nurse License at the Homer G. Phillips Hospital in St. Louis, Missouri. She completed a medical technology program in 1945 at the Northwest Institute of Medical Technology in Minneapolis, Minnesota. She received an American Red Cross certificate to teach first aid and disaster nursing. Johnson also became certified as a medical missionary.

== Contributions to the development of penicillin and the treatment of scarlet fever ==
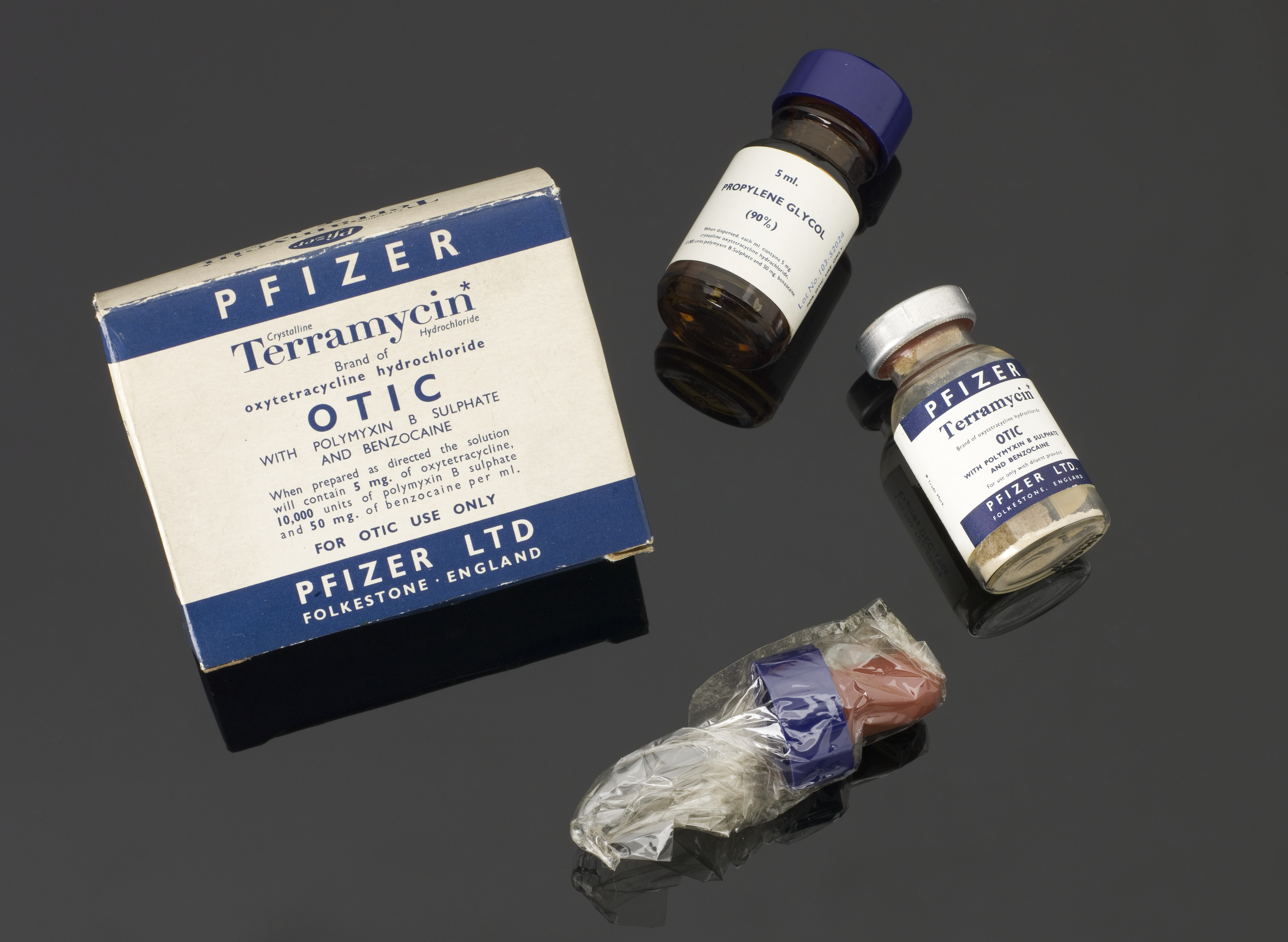
Bottle of Terramycin

Not long after completing the medical technology program, Johnson joined the University of Minnesota's Plant Pathology Department under Clyde M. Christensen as a lab technician working on penicillin research. Johnson's childhood provided her with a peculiar advantage in this field of work, as the research she performed often entailed isolating molds from various foods, especially vegetables. The same techniques that she used to make things like butter, jams, and soap on her childhood farm provided her with the needed insight to develop techniques that allowed her to capture and preserve molds for research purposes. A mouldy squash from her fridge at home killed the germs, according to one account. Johnson worked with a variety of vegetables during her time on this project, but it was a bowl of tomato soup provided by an employee of the department that finally yielded results. After isolating the mold from the soup, Johnson tested the strain against the bacteria that is known to cause Scarlet fever. The results of her experiment were promising, as this particular penicillin mold was particularly effective at killing the bacteria. She described the mold spores as 'terrible mice" and showed the mold to John Ehrlich, a colleague that was working on the project with her. She told him of the mold's effectiveness against Scarlet fever and even suggested that the medicine should be mixed with peppermint syrup to be more tasty for children. Ehrlich took the samples and put them in his pocket, but Johnson never heard anything about her discovery after that.

In 1950 later, the antibiotic Terramycin was introduced, and Johnson believed that it was created from her "terrible mice" mold and that her recommendation of adding peppermint syrup for taste led to the creation of Terramycin syrup. Pfizer developed and sold Terramycin, and the sales of this medication rose to $45 million. Pfizer does not disagree that Johnson was a part of the Penicillin Project, however Johnson was never compensated for her work on the medication.

She was honored by Congressman Louis Stokes on October 23, 1990, in a speech to the House of Representatives for all of her accomplishments.

== Contributions to the National Black Nurses Association ==
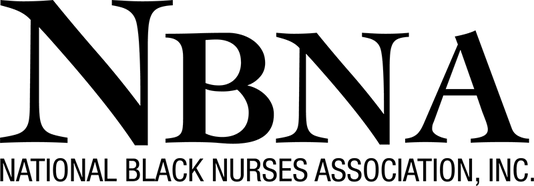
Logo for the NBNA

In 1970, nurses from around the nation gathered in Miami, Florida for the 47th convention of the American Nurses Association (ANA). While attending, Mattiedna Johnson was concerned with the lack of representation for Black nurses. To discuss these matters, she hosted a meeting for Black nurses where they addressed the issues of underrepresentation and other problems in Black health care. She wanted to continue the conversation, so in 1971, Johnson and 11 other Black nurses founded the National Black Nurses Association (NBNA). The Interim Steering Committee was also selected at this first meeting, and Johnson was appointed as Secretary. She founded the Cleveland Council of Black Nurses in 1973.

== Contributions to blood pressure screenings ==
Mattiedna Johnson and some of her fellow nurses did a 575-person blood pressure screening after noticing the number of funerals their church was having. The screening was done at Cory United Methodist Church. It led to blood pressure screenings become widespread as it was the first time that blood pressure screenings were done outside of a hospital. Johnson later became involved in the International Society on Hypertension in Blacks (ISHIB).
