= Blake v. United States =

- Supreme Court of the United States

Decided January 1, 1880
- Full case name: Blake v. United States
- Citations: 103 U.S. 227 (more)

Holding
- The President has the power to remove an officer of the United States by the appointment of a successor.

Court membership
- Chief Justice Morrison Waite Associate Justices Nathan Clifford · Noah H. Swayne; Samuel F. Miller · Stephen J. Field; William Strong · Joseph P. Bradley; Ward Hunt · John M. Harlan

Case opinion
- Majority: Harlan, joined by unanimous

Laws applied
- U.S. Const. art. II, § 2, cl. 2

Blake v. United States, 103 U.S. 227 (1880), was a decision of the United States Supreme Court concerning the removal power under the Appointments Clause. Justice John Marshall Harlan delivered the opinion of the Court:

If the power of the President and Senate, in this regard, could be constitutionally subjected to restrictions by statute (as to which we express no opinion), it is sufficient for the present case to say that Congress did not intend by that section to impose them.

After Abraham Lincoln was assassinated, his Vice-President Andrew Johnson became President. The new president was openly hostile to Congress' Reconstruction policies, and Congress responded by imposing substantial restrictions on the President's removal power, including the controversial Tenure of Office Act.

One of these statutes similar to the Tenure of Office Act required the President to secure Senate approval to remove military personnel. The Court writes that the law was "suggested by the serious differences existing...between the legislative and executive branches of the government in reference to the enforcement in the States lately in rebellion, of the reconstruction acts of Congress".

The Court explains:

Most, if not all, of the senior officers of the army enjoyed, as we may know from the public history of that period, the confidence of [the Republican Party] then controlling the legislative branch of the government. It was believed that, within the limits of the authority conferred by statute, they would carry out the policy of Congress, as indicated in the reconstruction acts, and suppress all attempts to treat them as unconstitutional and void, or to overthrow them by force.

When Blake resigned from his position, Gilmore was appointed with the advice and consent of the Senate. Blake later claimed his resignation was void because he was insane at the time he resigned.

The Court considered whether Gilmore's proper appointment was sufficient to remove Blake from the post-chaplaincy regardless of the validity of Blake's resignation. The Court concluded that the statute restricting the President to removal "upon and in pursuance of the sentence of a court-martial" was not intended to restrict the power of the President to effectuate removals by appointment of a successor, because appointment was always subject to the advice and consent of the Senate.
