= M. Elizabeth Shellabarger =

Nurse

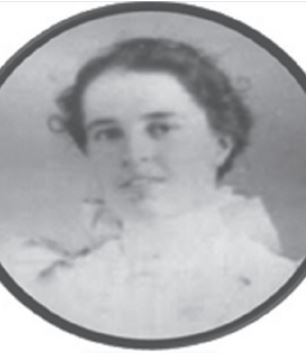
M. Elizabeth Shellabarger in 1897

Mary Elizabeth Shellabarger (October 16, 1879 – June 25, 1967) was a Registered Nurse, army nurse overseas during World War I, and director of American Red Cross Nursing Service in Albania and Montenegro.

== Early life ==
M. Elizabeth Shellabarger was born in Moffat, Colorado, on October 16, 1879, the daughter of Adam Shellabarger (died 1915) and Abigal "Abbie" Wales, Colorado pioneers. The other children were: Charles Walter (b. 1875), Ralph Wales (b. 1877), Emma Irene (b. 1882), Clara Ethel "Dolly" (b. 1884), Gertrude Eloise (b. 1891).

Shellabarger graduated from East High School (Denver) in 1899 and then attended a Special Literary Course at Emerson College of Oratory in Boston, in 1901 and 1902, and a Vocal training at New England Conservatory of Music. She entered Bellevue Hospital Training School of Nursing in June 1905, graduating in 1908, and Teachers College, Columbia University, in 1916, obtaining a B. S. in 1920.

== Career ==
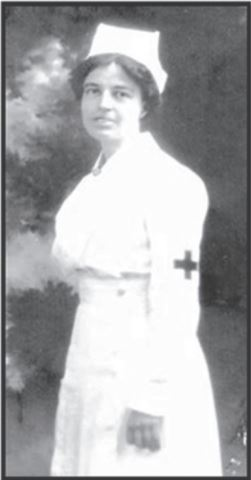
M. Elizabeth Shellabarger in 1914

M. Elizabeth Shellabarger was the first person from Saguache County, Colorado, to become a Registered Nurse.

=== 1900s ===
In 1908, Shellabarger was appointed Junior Supervisor and Instructor in Maternal Medicine at Bellevue Hospital Training School of Nursing. In 1909, she was named Assistant Director of Touro Infirmary in New Orleans with a class of 100 students.

=== 1910s ===
From 1910 to 1912, Shellabarger was Superintendent of the Visiting Nurses Association of Denver. From 1912 to 1916, she was Superintendent of the School of Nursing at St. Mark's Hospital, Salt Lake City. In 1914, she was appointed President of the Graduate Nurses Association, Salt Lake City. She was an army nurse overseas during World War I: in 1917 she joined the University of Colorado Hospital Unit of the American Red Cross and in 1918 she served as Assistant Chief Nurse in London and Winchester, England. On the travel back to the United States she was Chief Nurse on the Hospital Ship RMS Saxonia (1899). In 1919, she was instructor at the Army School of Nursing, Fox Hill, Staten Island, New York.

=== 1920s ===
From 1920 to 1921, Shellabarger was Director of the Public Health Nursing Course at the University of Colorado, with field service at Pueblo, Colorado. In 1922, she was director of Public Health Nursing under the American Red Cross Nursing Service in Albania and Montenegro. In 1924, she was Director of the Public Health Nursing Course at the Missouri School of Social Economy in St. Louis. From 1925 to 1927, she was Superintendent of Hospital and School of Nursing at Memorial Hospital, Cheyenne, Wyoming: from this position she voluntary resigned when the Board of Trustees would not give the necessary support to raise the standards and meet the requirements to become Class A under College of Surgeons. She was the president of the Wyoming State Nurses Association in 1926. In 1928 and 1930, she made a survey of Schools of Nursing in Arkansas for the State Board of Nursing Examiners while she was Inspector of Schools of Nursing. She was then named Educational Secretary. In October 1929, she taught Sciences at the City School of Nursing, Colorado.

=== 1930s ===
In 1931, Shellabarger worked for the Texas State Board Drought Relief 12 Counties at the Brady Texas Center. From 1931 to 1933, she worked for the Official Bureau at Houston, Texas. From 1934 to 1936, she was Superintendent of Public Health Nurses in El Paso and three counties of Texas. She was President of the Texas State Organization for Public Health Nursing in 1934 and 1935. In 1936, she was Regional Supervisor for New Mexico. From 1937 to 1938, she was Supervisor at the Methodist National Sanatorium, Colorado Springs, Colorado. In 1939, she was dietitian and nurse for 200 soldiers at the Soldier&Sailors Home at Home Lake, Colorado.

=== 1940s ===
In 1940, Shellabarger worked for the Official Nursing Bureau at San Antonio, Texas. From 1940 to 1941, she taught a Refresher Course at San Antonio, Texas. In 1942, she was instructor at the University of the Incarnate Word teaching to Registered Nurse how to teach History of Nursing and Public Health Nursing Field.

Shellabarger contributed at the American Journal of Nursing (AJN).

Shellabarger was member of American Legion Auxiliary, Cheyenne College Club, American League of Nursing Education, American Public Health Association, Episcopal Church, Order of the Eastern Star, Daughters of the American Revolution, and American Association of University Women.

== Personal life ==
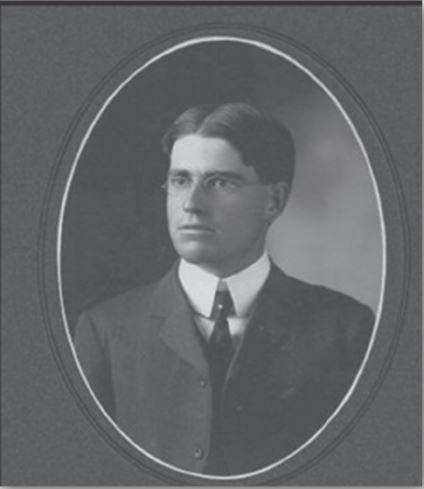
Ralph Wykes Garretson (1878-1903)

M. Elizabeth Shellabarger lived at Rito Alto Ranch, Moffat, Colorado, and retired to Tempe, Arizona, in the 1950s.

At the end of the 19th century Shellabarger was romantically involved with Ralph Wykes Garretson (1878-1903), but he died on September 7, 1903, from a ruptured appendix. It was then that Shellabarger decided to become a nurse.

Shellabarger died on June 25, 1967, and was buried, with military honors, at the Santa Fe National Cemetery, New Mexico.

== Legacy ==
Alice Elizabeth Selch Stephenson, her grandniece, wrote the memoirs of Mary Elizabeth "Bess" Shellabarger, Three Scuffed Suitcases: Biography from the diaries Of Mary Elizabeth "Bess" Shellabarger Colorado World War I Nurse.
