= Motion to compel =

Request for a court order

A motion to compel asks the court to order either the opposing party or a third party to take some action. This sort of motion most commonly deals with discovery disputes, when a party who has propounded discovery to either the opposing party or a third party believes that the discovery responses are insufficient. The motion to compel is used to ask the court to order the non-complying party to produce the documentation or information requested, and/or to sanction the non-complying party for their failure to comply with the discovery requests.

== Federal Rule of Civil Procedure Rule 37 ==
Pursuant to FRCP 37, "On notice to other parties and all affected persons, a party may move for an order compelling disclosure or discovery. The motion must include a certification that the movant has in good faith conferred or attempted to confer with the person or party failing to make disclosure or discovery in an effort to obtain it without court action."

According to rule 37, the moving party must give the appropriate notice to the responding party. This allows the other party the opportunity to answer the alleged inadequate responses. Thereafter, if the questions have not been adequately responded to, then the moving party may ask the court for a motion to compel.

California requires that the moving party provides a statement in support of the motion to compel. This is known as a 3-1020 document which includes the question asked, the answer given, and a reason as to why the answer should be compelled.

Failure to Participate in Framing a Discovery Plan: If a party or its attorney fails to participate in good faith in developing and submitting a proposed discovery plan as required by Rule 26(f), the court may, after giving an opportunity to be heard, require that party or attorney to pay to any other party the reasonable expenses, including attorney's fees, caused by the failure.

== Under California state court rules ==
For Interrogatories, there is no time limit for a motion to compel if the party upon which the interrogatories were propounded has failed to respond. However, if the responses are merely insufficient, the propounding party has a 45-day limit in which to submit the motion to compel. Additionally, the propounding party must "meet and confer" with the responding party prior to submitting the motion. Pursuant to California Rule of Court 3-1345 a motion to compel must include the following parts:

(c) Contents of separate statement

A separate statement is a separate document filed and served with the discovery motion that provides all the information necessary to understand each discovery request and all the responses to it that are at issue. The separate statement must be full and complete so that no person is required to review any other document in order to determine the full request and the full response. Material must not be incorporated into the separate statement by reference. The separate statement must include-for each discovery request (e.g., each interrogatory, request for admission, deposition question, or inspection demand) to which a further response, answer, or production is requested-the following:

1. The text of the request, interrogatory, question, or inspection demand;
2. The text of each response, answer, or objection, and any further responses or answers;
3. A statement of the factual and legal reasons for compelling further responses, answers, or production as to each matter in dispute;
4. If necessary, the text of all definitions, instructions, and other matters required to understand each discovery request and the responses to it;
5. If the response to a particular discovery request is dependent on the response given to another discovery request, or if the reasons a further response to a particular discovery request is deemed necessary are based on the response to some other discovery request, the other request and the response to it must be set forth; and
6. If the pleadings, other documents in the file, or other items of discovery are relevant to the motion, the party relying on them must summarize each relevant document.
