= United States v. National Treasury Employees Union =

- Supreme Court of the United States

Argued November 8, 1994 Decided February 22, 1995
- Full case name: United States, et al. v. National Treasury Employees Union, et al.
- Citations: 513 U.S. 454 (more) 115 S. Ct. 1003; 130 L. Ed. 2d 964; 1995 U.S. LEXIS 1624

Holding
- Section 501(b) of the Ethics in Government Act of 1978 violates the First Amendment.

Court membership
- Chief Justice William Rehnquist Associate Justices John P. Stevens · Sandra Day O'Connor; Antonin Scalia · Anthony Kennedy; David Souter · Clarence Thomas; Ruth Bader Ginsburg · Stephen Breyer

Case opinions
- Majority: Stevens, joined by Kennedy, Souter, Ginsburg, Breyer
- Concur/dissent: O'Connor
- Dissent: Rehnquist, joined by Scalia, Thomas

United States v. National Treasury Employees Union, 513 U.S. 454 (1995), was a United States Supreme Court case in which the Court held that Section 501(b) of the Ethics in Government Act of 1978 violates the First Amendment of the United States Constitution.

== Background ==
Congress amended the Ethics in Government Act of 1978 with the Ethics Reform Act of 1989 (Pub. L. 101–194). In section 501(b), Congress prohibited its members, federal officers, and other government employees from "accepting an honorarium for making an appearance, speech, or writing an article."

The National Treasury Employees Union challenged this section as an unconstitutional violation of the First Amendment's freedom of speech protection. The District Court held the honorarium ban unconstitutional and enjoined the government from enforcing it. The United States Court of Appeals for the District of Columbia Circuit affirmed the District Court's holding.

== Opinion of the Court ==
Associate Justice John Paul Stevens authored the majority opinion. Citing the test put forward in Pickering v. Board of Education of Township High School District 205, the Court found that the restriction put in place in Section 501(b) of the Act "constitutes a wholesale deterrent to a broad category of expression by a massive number of potential speakers" requiring an even greater burden than that put forward in Pickering.
