= Winton Woods High School =

Public, coeducational high school in Cincinnati, Ohio, United States

Location
- 1231 West Kemper Road; Cincinnati, (Hamilton County), Ohio 45240; United States; 39°17′13″N 84°31′35″W

Information
- Type: Public, coeducational high school
- Opened: 1991
- School district: Winton Woods City School District
- Superintendent: Anthony G. Smith
- Principal: Eric Martin
- Teaching staff: 79.00 (FTE)
- Grades: 9–12
- Student to teacher ratio: 15.97
- Campus: Suburban
- Colors: Green and blue
- Fight song: Winton Woods Warriors
- Athletics conference: Eastern Cincinnati Conference
- Mascot: Warrior
- Team name: Warriors
- Accreditation: North Central Association of Colleges and Schools
- Website: nchs.wintonwoods.org

Winton Woods High School is a public high school located in Forest Park, just north of Cincinnati, Ohio, United States. It is the only high school in the Winton Woods City School District. Winton Woods High School serves about 1,560 students from Village of Greenhills, the City of Forest Park, and parts of Springfield Township.

== History ==
Winton Woods High School opened during the 1991–92 academic year, after the merging of the district's two former high schools, Greenhills High School and Forest Park High School. Winton Woods High School is housed in the Winton Woods North Campus, a facility serving grades 7–12 that opened in 2021 and replaced the former building, which housed Forest Park High School until 1991 and Winton Woods High School from 1991 to 2021.

== Athletics ==
- Fall sports: Cheerleading, cross country, football, golf, soccer, tennis (girls), volleyball
- Winter sports: Basketball, bowling, swimming, wrestling
- Spring sports: Baseball, softball, tennis (boys), track, lacrosse

== Ohio High School Athletic Association state championships ==
- Boys' football – 2009, 2021
- Girls' basketball – 1984*, 2025
- Boys' track and field* – 1988, 1989
- Boys' baseball** – 1956
- Boys' cross country** – 1986

* Titles won by Forest Park High School prior to merger.
** Titles won by Greenhills High School prior to merger.

== Notable alumni ==
- Rayshawn Askew, former football player
- Maalik Bomar, football player
- Cameron Calhoun, football player
- Kwan Cheatham (born 1995), basketball player for Ironi Nes Ziona of the Israel Basketball Premier League
- Semaj Christon, basketball player
- Mike Edwards, football player
- Tony George, former football player
- Robert Hite, basketball player
- David Long Jr., football player
- Jermaine Mathews Jr., football player
- Brandon Miree, former football player
- Luke Spencer, soccer coach and former player
- Miyan Williams, football player
