= Finneytown, Ohio =

- CDP
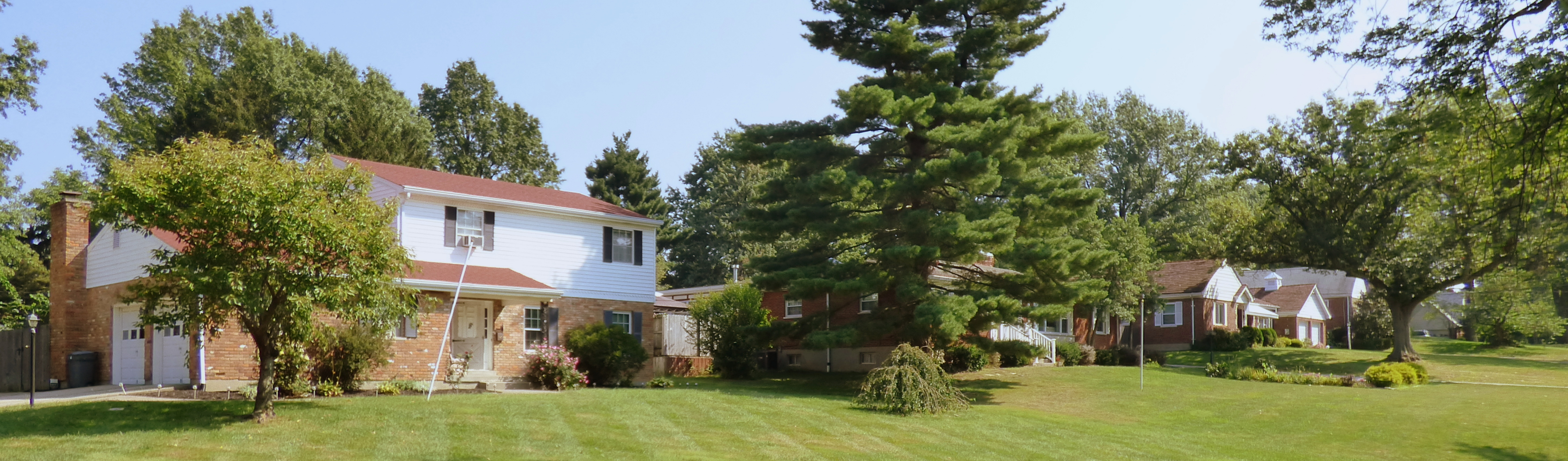
- Residential area in Finneytown

- Location in Hamilton County and the state of Ohio
- Coordinates: 39°12′49″N 84°30′00″W
- Country: United States
- State: Ohio
- County: Hamilton

Area
  - Total: 3.98 sq mi (10.32 km^{2})
  - Land: 3.98 sq mi (10.32 km^{2})
  - Water: 0 sq mi (0.00 km^{2})
- Elevation: 840 ft (260 m)

Population (2020)
  - Total: 12,399
  - Density: 3,110/sq mi (1,201/km^{2})
- Time zone: UTC-5 (Eastern (EST))
  - Summer (DST): UTC-4 (EDT)
- ZIP codes: 45224, 45231
- Area code: 513
- FIPS code: 39-27104
- GNIS feature ID: 2392997

Finneytown is a census-designated place (CDP) in Springfield Township, Hamilton County, in southwest Ohio, United States, just north of Cincinnati. The population was 12,399 at the 2020 census. Finneytown is home to the second largest private school in Ohio (St. Xavier High School) and the Cincinnati area's annual Greek Festival (at Holy Trinity-St. Nicholas Greek Orthodox Church).

Finneytown is named for Ebenezer Ward Finney, a Revolutionary War soldier buried just south of the present-day township. The land was orginally purchased from John Cleves Symmes by the Reverend Ebenezer Ward, who gave it to his grandson, Finney

== History ==
=== Founding ===
In April 1795, an old preacher named Reverend Ebenezer Ward bought the section of land which included modern day Finneytown from John Cleves Symmes. Ebenezer Ward became ill and wrote a will which designated the land to be inherited by his grandson, Ebenezer Ward Finney (born 1755). At the time the 41-year-old Finney was living in Rensselaer County, New York and had served in the 4th New York Regiment during the American Revolutionary War. Once he learned about his inheritance of Rev. Ward's land, Finney traveled to Finneytown to inspect the land. Finneytown at the time was sparsely populated and had one trail that went East-West, known at the time as The North Bend to Carthage Trace (modern day Northbend Road) and an Indian trail that went North-South. Finney sold his old farm and moved into Finneytown with his family in 1800. He set up his farmstead on a hilltop location near the North Bend road and the road to Winton's Plantation, and he also donated a plot of his land for a small church. Ebenezer Ward Finney died in 1822 at the age of 67. One of the original pioneers, Samuel Raymond, moved to Finney's land and built a blacksmith shop, which remained until the 20th century.

=== Suburbanization ===
In the 20th century, Finneytown experienced growth as it transitioned from a rural area to a suburb. 1905 saw the founding of Special District School #10 to meet the demand for education, which was finished in 1915. Additionally, the early 20th century saw the introduction of automobiles to Finneytown, which resulted in the paving of the area's dirt roads. Winton Road, one of the area's main streets, was among the first to be paved in 1926.

After the Second World War, Finneytown saw a population boom as the school age population increased by 368% between 1948 and 1958. Farms were replaced by suburban housing and shopping centers. This population growth occurred at the same time a requirement for K-12 programs was introduced, which led to the founding of the Finneytown Secondary Campus in 1958. This was followed by the construction of Cottonwood Elementary in 1962 and Brent Elementary in 1964. In 2010, Cottonwood Elementary was demolished due to the difficulty of maintenance, and a new elementary school, Finneytown Elementary, was built in 2022 to replace Brent.

== Geography ==
According to the United States Census Bureau, the CDP has a total area of 4.0 square miles (10 km^{2}), all land.

== Demographics ==
Historical population
Census	Pop.	Note	%±
2020	12,399		—
U.S. Decennial Census

=== 2020 census ===
As of the 2020 census, Finneytown had a population of 12,399, with a population density of 3,110.64 people per square mile (1,201.00/km^{2}). The median age was 40.1 years. 22.8% of residents were under the age of 18 and 18.6% of residents were 65 years of age or older. For every 100 females there were 87.4 males, and for every 100 females age 18 and over there were 82.8 males age 18 and over.

100.0% of residents lived in urban areas, while 0.0% lived in rural areas.

There were 4,880 households in Finneytown, of which 30.5% had children under the age of 18 living in them. Of all households, 45.4% were married-couple households, 13.5% were households with a male householder and no spouse or partner present, and 34.5% were households with a female householder and no spouse or partner present. About 25.9% of all households were made up of individuals and 12.4% had someone living alone who was 65 years of age or older. The average household size was 2.48, and the average family size was 2.95.

There were 5,105 housing units, of which 4.4% were vacant. The homeowner vacancy rate was 0.9% and the rental vacancy rate was 6.5%.

Racial composition as of the 2020 census
Race	Number	Percent
White	6,251	50.4%
Black or African American	4,599	37.1%
American Indian and Alaska Native	35	0.3%
Asian	592	4.8%
Native Hawaiian and Other Pacific Islander	1	0.0%
Some other race	200	1.6%
Two or more races	721	5.8%
Hispanic or Latino (of any race)	352	2.8%

=== Income and poverty ===
According to the U.S. Census American Community Survey, for the period 2016-2020 the estimated median annual income for a household in the CDP was $73,196, and the median income for a family was $75,196. About 7.4% of the population were living below the poverty line, including 17.4% of those under age 18 and 2.9% of those age 65 or over. About 62.5% of the population were employed, and 35.1% had a bachelor's degree or higher.

=== 2010 census ===
The population was 12,741 at the U.S. 2010 census, in 5,294 housing units. The racial makeup of the CDP was 61.7% White, 33.7% Black, 1.9% Hispanic, with others 1% or less.

=== 2000 census ===
As of the census of 2000, there were 13,492 people, 5,194 households, and 3,807 families residing in the CDP. The population density was 3,382.8 inhabitants per square mile (1,306.1/km^{2}). There were 5,336 housing units at an average density of 1,337.9/sq mi (516.4/km^{2}). The racial makeup was 72.95% White, 23.83% African American, 0.16% Native American, 1.10% Asian, 0.01% Pacific Islander, 0.45% from other races, and 1.48% from two or more races. Hispanic or Latino of any race were 0.80% of the population.

There were 5,194 households, out of which 34.6% had children under the age of 18 living with them, 55.7% were married couples living together, 14.6% had a female householder with no husband present, and 26.7% were non-families. 23.9% of all households were made up of individuals, and 10.7% had someone living alone who was 65 years of age or older. The average household size was 2.57 and the average family size was 3.04.

In the CDP, the population was spread out, with 27.6% under the age of 18, 6.1% from 18 to 24, 26.3% from 25 to 44, 22.9% from 45 to 64, and 17.1% who were 65 years of age or older. The median age was 38 years. For every 100 females, there were 87.9 males. For every 100 females age 18 and over, there were 80.3 males.

The median income for a household in the CDP was $52,219, and the median income for a family had been $58,393. Males had a median income of $41,932 versus $31,250 for females. The per capita income for the CDP was $25,355. About 4.3% of families and 5.9% of the population were below the poverty line, including 7.5% of those under age 18 and 4.1% of those age 65 or over.

== Culture ==
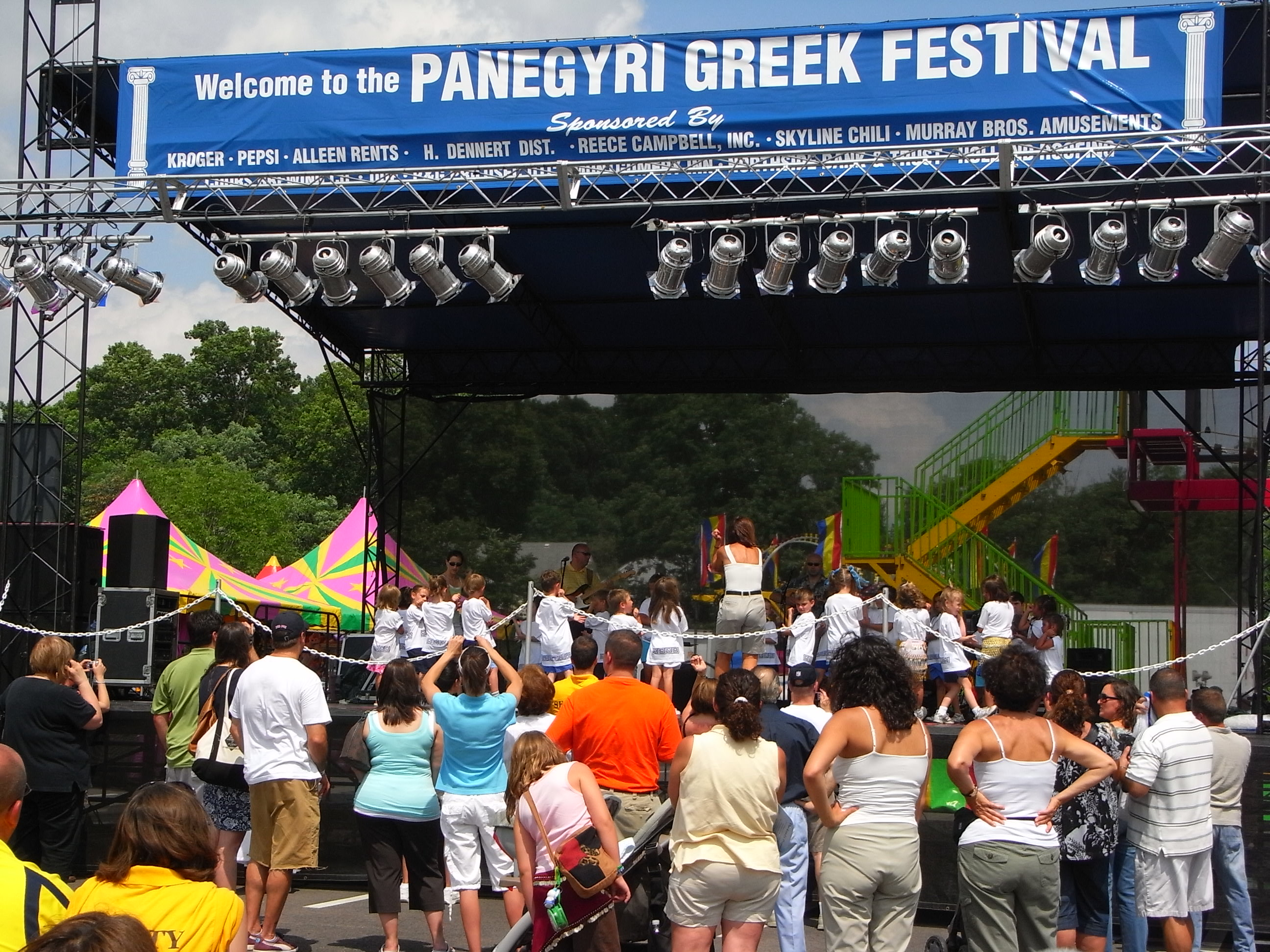
Panegyri Greek Festival in 2008

Finneytown is the home of the annual Panegyri Greek Festival, one of the largest annual ethnic food celebrations in the Cincinnati area. The Holy Trinity-Saint Nicholas Greek Orthodox Church started the yearly festival in 1975. It has included authentic Greek food, music, dancing, and an art show. The festival has been held in June in recent years.

== Education ==
=== Public School District ===
The Finneytown Local School District serves the neighborhood and surrounding area. The district has 2 schools that are divided by grades. They include: Finneytown Elementary (K-6) and the Junior/Senior High or Secondary Campus (7-12).

=== Private Schools ===
There are four private schools within Finneytown:

- John Paul II (K-8)
- St Vivians (K-8)
- Central Baptist (K-8)
- St Xavier High School (9-12)

As of 2016, St. Xavier is the largest private school in Ohio.

Finneytown is also home to the Cincinnati College of Mortuary Science.

== In popular culture ==
- Pringles potato chips were named after Pringle Drive, a street in Finneytown.
- Goat, a movie starring Nick Jonas, was filmed in 2015 in Finneytown.

== Notable people ==
- Darius Bazley, basketball player
- Amanda Borden, 1996 Olympic gold medallist in gymnastics
- Donavon Clark, football player
- Charley Harper, artist
- Joe Hudepohl, 1992 and 1996 Olympic gold medalist in swimming
- Jeffrey R. Immelt, businessman
- Justin Jeffre, member of the band 98 Degrees
- James Michael Lafferty, businessman
- Marco Marsan, author
- Aajonus Vonderplanitz, primal nutritionist
