= Pleasant Run, Ohio =

- Census-designated place
- Location in Hamilton County and the state of Ohio
- Coordinates: 39°17′34″N 84°34′33″W
- Country: United States
- State: Ohio
- County: Hamilton
- Township: Colerain

Area
  - Total: 2.07 sq mi (5.36 km^{2})
  - Land: 2.07 sq mi (5.36 km^{2})
  - Water: 0 sq mi (0.00 km^{2})
- Elevation: 873 ft (266 m)

Population (2020)
  - Total: 4,861
  - Density: 2,346.9/sq mi (906.14/km^{2})
- Time zone: UTC-5 (Eastern (EST))
  - Summer (DST): UTC-4 (EDT)
- FIPS code: 39-63604
- GNIS feature ID: 2393190

Pleasant Run is a census-designated place (CDP) in Colerain Township, Hamilton County, Ohio, United States. The population was 4,861 at the 2020 census.

== History ==
Pleasant Run takes its name from a stream. A Pleasant Run Post Office was established on March 4, 1846, and discontinued on February 15, 1907, with mail service being transferred to the post office in Mount Healthy. Pleasant Run was described in the 1940 American Guide Series as a rural village with 39 inhabitants.

== Geography ==
According to the United States Census Bureau, the CDP has a total area of 2.1 square miles (5.4 km^{2}), all land.

Pleasant Run Farm is located to the east in neighboring Springfield Township.

== Demographics ==
Historical population
Census	Pop.	Note	%±
2020	4,861		—
U.S. Decennial Census

=== 2020 census ===
As of the 2020 census, Pleasant Run had a population of 4,861. The population density was 2,347.18 people per square mile (906.14/km^{2}). 99.8% of residents lived in urban areas, while 0.2% lived in rural areas.

The median age was 41.2 years. 20.8% of residents were under the age of 18 and 18.8% of residents were 65 years of age or older. For every 100 females there were 89.5 males, and for every 100 females age 18 and over there were 86.5 males age 18 and over.

There were 1,769 households in Pleasant Run, of which 30.3% had children under the age of 18 living in them. Of all households, 51.2% were married-couple households, 13.5% were households with a male householder and no spouse or partner present, and 27.5% were households with a female householder and no spouse or partner present. About 21.5% of all households were made up of individuals and 9.8% had someone living alone who was 65 years of age or older. The average household size was 2.65, and the average family size was 3.15.

There were 1,816 housing units, of which 2.6% were vacant. The homeowner vacancy rate was 1.1% and the rental vacancy rate was 3.5%.

Racial composition as of the 2020 census
Race	Number	Percent
White	3,317	68.2%
Black or African American	941	19.4%
American Indian and Alaska Native	22	0.5%
Asian	149	3.1%
Native Hawaiian and Other Pacific Islander	4	0.1%
Some other race	92	1.9%
Two or more races	336	6.9%
Hispanic or Latino (of any race)	163	3.4%

=== Income and poverty ===
According to the U.S. Census American Community Survey, for the period 2016-2020 the estimated median annual income for a household in the CDP was $76,250, and the median income for a family was $93,523. About 4.1% of the population were living below the poverty line, including 7.8% of those under age 18 and 2.9% of those age 65 or over. About 64.2% of the population were employed, and 22.9% had a bachelor's degree or higher.

=== 2000 census ===
At the 2000 census there were 5,267 people, 1,778 households, and 1,477 families living in the CDP. The population density was 2,541.6 inhabitants per square mile (981.3/km^{2}). There were 1,791 housing units at an average density of 864.3 per square mile (333.7/km^{2}). The racial makeup of the CDP was 88.65% White, 7.69% African American, 0.40% Native American, 1.92% Asian, 0.04% Pacific Islander, 0.23% from other races, and 1.08% from two or more races. Hispanic or Latino of any race were 1.16%.

Of the 1,778 households 42.4% had children under the age of 18 living with them, 69.0% were married couples living together, 10.0% had a female householder with no husband present, and 16.9% were non-families. 15.1% of households were one person and 4.2% were one person aged 65 or older. The average household size was 2.95 and the average family size was 3.26.

The age distribution was 29.3% under the age of 18, 7.7% from 18 to 24, 32.0% from 25 to 44, 24.0% from 45 to 64, and 7.0% 65 or older. The median age was 34 years. For every 100 females, there were 97.6 males. For every 100 females age 18 and over, there were 92.6 males.

The median household income was $57,065 and the median family income was $60,305. Males had a median income of $37,973 versus $30,432 for females. The per capita income for the CDP was $20,307. About 1.7% of families and 3.0% of the population were below the poverty line, including 2.5% of those under age 18 and none of those age 65 or over.
