= Finneytown Secondary Campus =

Public high school in the Finneytown neighborhood of Cincinnati, Ohio, US

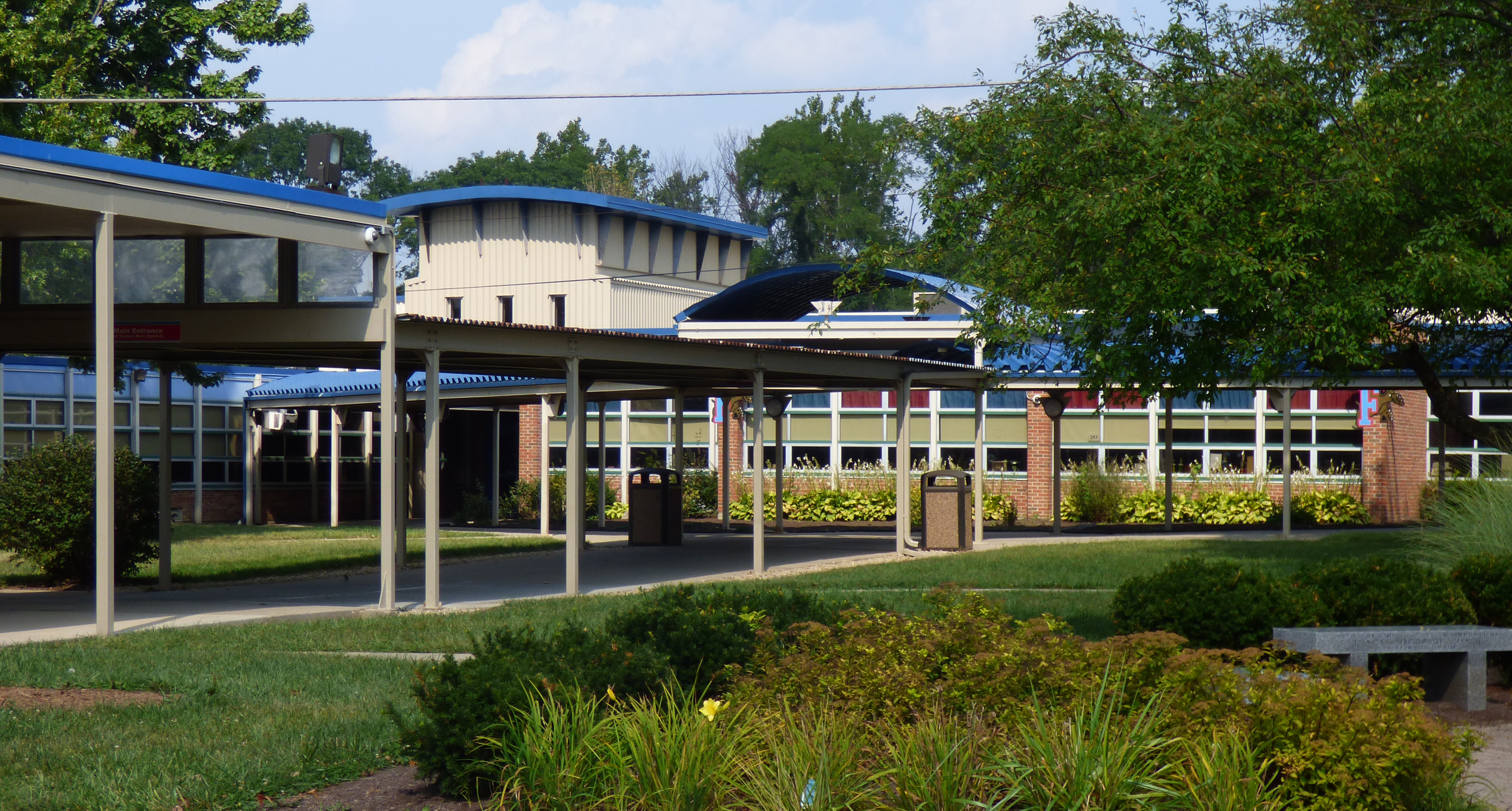

Location
- 8916 Fontainebleau Terrace; Cincinnati, Hamilton County, Ohio 45231; United States; 39°13′47″N 84°30′59″W

Information
- Type: High School
- Motto: THINK critically, GROW intellectually, and LIVE with integrity
- Established: 1958; 68 years ago
- Founder: Ebenezer Finney
- School district: Finneytown Local Schools
- Superintendent: Anthony Smith
- Principal: Carol Miller
- Teaching staff: 35.59 (FTE)
- Grades: 7-12
- Enrollment: 536 (2023–2024)
- Student to teacher ratio: 15.06
- Campus size: Small
- Colors: Carolina Blue and Red
- Athletics conference: Cincinnati Hills League
- Mascot: Wildcat
- Nickname: Wildcats
- Accreditation: North Central Association of Colleges and Schools
- National ranking: #11,688
- Website: www.finneytown.org

Finneytown Secondary Campus is a public high school in Finneytown, Hamilton County, Ohio, and is the only public High School in the Finneytown Local School District. The district serves the entirety of Finneytown which is in Springfield Township.

Finneytown sports teams are known as the Wildcats. The Wildcats compete in the Cincinnati Hills League (CHL), a competitive small school league in the Cincinnati area. The high school also has a competitive marching band that competes in regional and national competitions.

== History ==
Before the secondary campus was built, students in Finneytown would attend Whitaker Elementary from 1st to 8th grades and would then need to transfer to other nearby public schools such as Hughes, Mt.Healthy, or Wyoming for high school education. During the late 1940s and 1950s, the population of Finneytown increased by 368%, thus increasing the demand for a high school. In 1955, an issue was passed by the residents to construct a high school. The school was partially built and opened to the first Finneytown freshman class in 1958. The secondary campus initially included two main buildings and one administration building. In the following years the high school was further expanded through the construction of additional buildings. The first expansion of the school was the construction of the gym was in 1964. The auditorium, the Performing Arts Center, and a third main building was constructed in 1969. in 1997, the two main buildings were connected through a construction of a connecting hallway building.

Due to the age of the original building, Finneytown residents passed an issue in 2019 for a plan to construct new schools to replace the school district's aging buildings. In 2022, the state of Ohio approved funding for a new Finneytown middle and high school.

Construction of the new Secondary Campus building had begun in late 2024 with construction occurring in close proximity to the original building's location. The new building is expected to be completed in December 2026, with students and teachers migrating to the new location after the conclusion of the 2026-2027 school year's winter break.

== Athletics ==
Finneytown Secondary Campus has various sports teams, which compete in the Cincinnati Hills League. Finneytown offers the following sports:

- Boys Sports:
  - Baseball
  - Basketball
  - Bowling
  - Cross country
  - Football
  - Golf
  - Soccer
  - Swimming
  - Tennis
  - Track and field
  - Wrestling
- Girls Sports:
  - Basketball
  - Bowling
  - Cross country
  - Soccer
  - Softball
  - Swimming
  - Track and field
  - Volleyball
  - Wrestling

=== Ohio High School Athletic Association State Championships ===
Finneytown has won a total of 3 OHSAA team state championships in the following sports:

- Boys Soccer – 1976, 1981
- Girls Swimming – 1979

==== Other Non-Sanctioned State Championships ====
- Boys Soccer – 1974

== Finneytown High School Marching Band ==
Finneytown Secondary Campus has a marching band which competes at a regional and national level. The Finneytown marching band has competed at Ohio Music Education Association (OMEA), Mid-States Band Association (MSBA), and Bands of America (BOA) competitions. The Finneytown marching band is also disproportionately large in the number of participating students compared to the high school's student enrollment. This can be seen by the band competing in BOA class A (600 or fewer enrolled students) for the 2022 season and in MSBA class AAAA (60–89 marching band members) for the 2022 season. Despite this, the band performs well at the regional and national levels. The band has managed to achieve 2nd place in MSBA class AAAA 2021 finals, 3rd place in MSBA class AAAA 2022 finals, and 5th in class A in BOA 2022 prelims.

The Finneytown marching band is directed by Director Bradley Delaney and Assistant Director Samuel Fronk.

Finals Rankings
Year	Name of Show	Rank
2018	Over the Falls	1st in MSBA AAA prelims 4th in MSBA AAA finals
2019	From Darkness into Light	10th in MSBA AAAA finals
2020	Season cancelled due to the COVID-19 pandemic	N/A
2021	Rise	2nd in MSBA AAAA finals
2022	A Winter at the Lake (Formal Field Commanders Hassan Peeples, Grace Finch, Finn Traubert)	3rd in MSBA AAAA finals 5th in Class A BOA prelims
2023	Among the Clouds (Field Commanders Hassan Peeples and Grace Finch)	5th in MSBA AAA finals 8th in Class A BOA prelims
2024	Hypnotic (Formal Field Commander: Janiyah Fields)	6th in MSBA AAA finals Superior rating at OMEA Marching Band Finals
2025	City Pulse (Formal Field Commander: Janiyah Fields)	
2026	Eternal Light (Former Field Commander: Jacob Quezada)	

== P.E.M. memorial ==
During The Who concert on December 3, 1979, a crowd disaster took place, which resulted in the death of 11 people of which 3 were Finneytown students. The three Finneytown students were Stephan Preston, Jackie Eckerle, and Karen Morrison. In 2010, the P.E.M. memorial was created by several Finneytown alumni with P.E.M. standing for the first letter of the surnames of the students that died at the concert. The memorial consists of a bench with an etched guitar with the inscription "My Generation" and plaque portraits of the three students near the bench. A scholarship commemorating the three students was created to coincide the memorial. The P.E.M. Scholarship is awarded every year to three Finneytown seniors who are perusing arts or music at a university or college. Every first Saturday in December, the P.E.M. memorial event takes place at the Performing Arts Center (PAC) building of the school. A Finneytown Alumni Band and various local music artists perform at the event to commemorate the three students and raise money for the P.E.M. scholarship.

On May 15, 2022, The Who performed at Cincinnati for the first time since the concert disaster as part of their "The Who Hits Back" tour. The Who had several students from Finneytown perform on stage with them for a portion of the concert. The Who also had a local band, which included Finneytown students from 1979, perform for the opening of the concert.

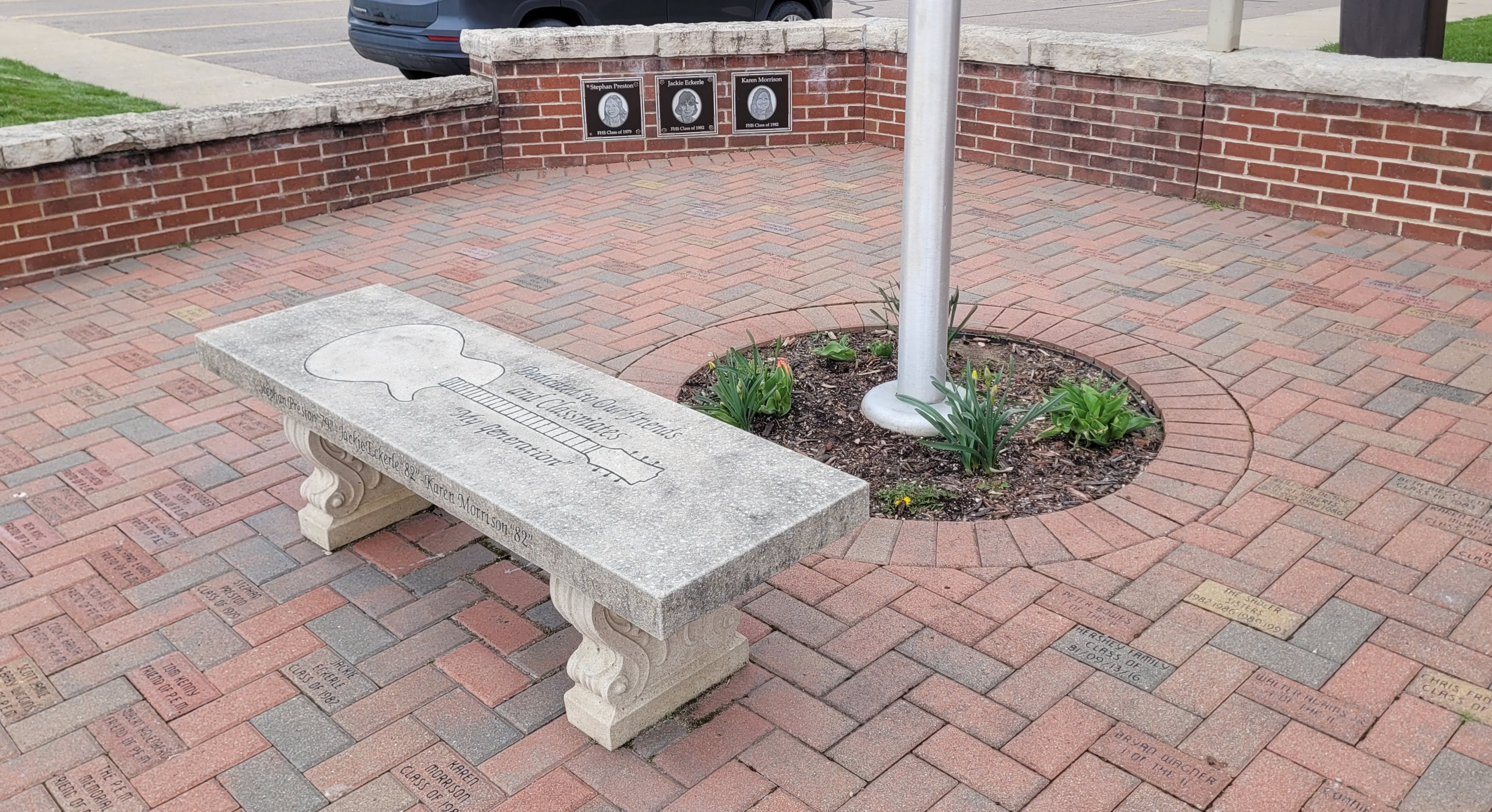
A picture of the PEM memorial at the Finneytown Secondary Campus

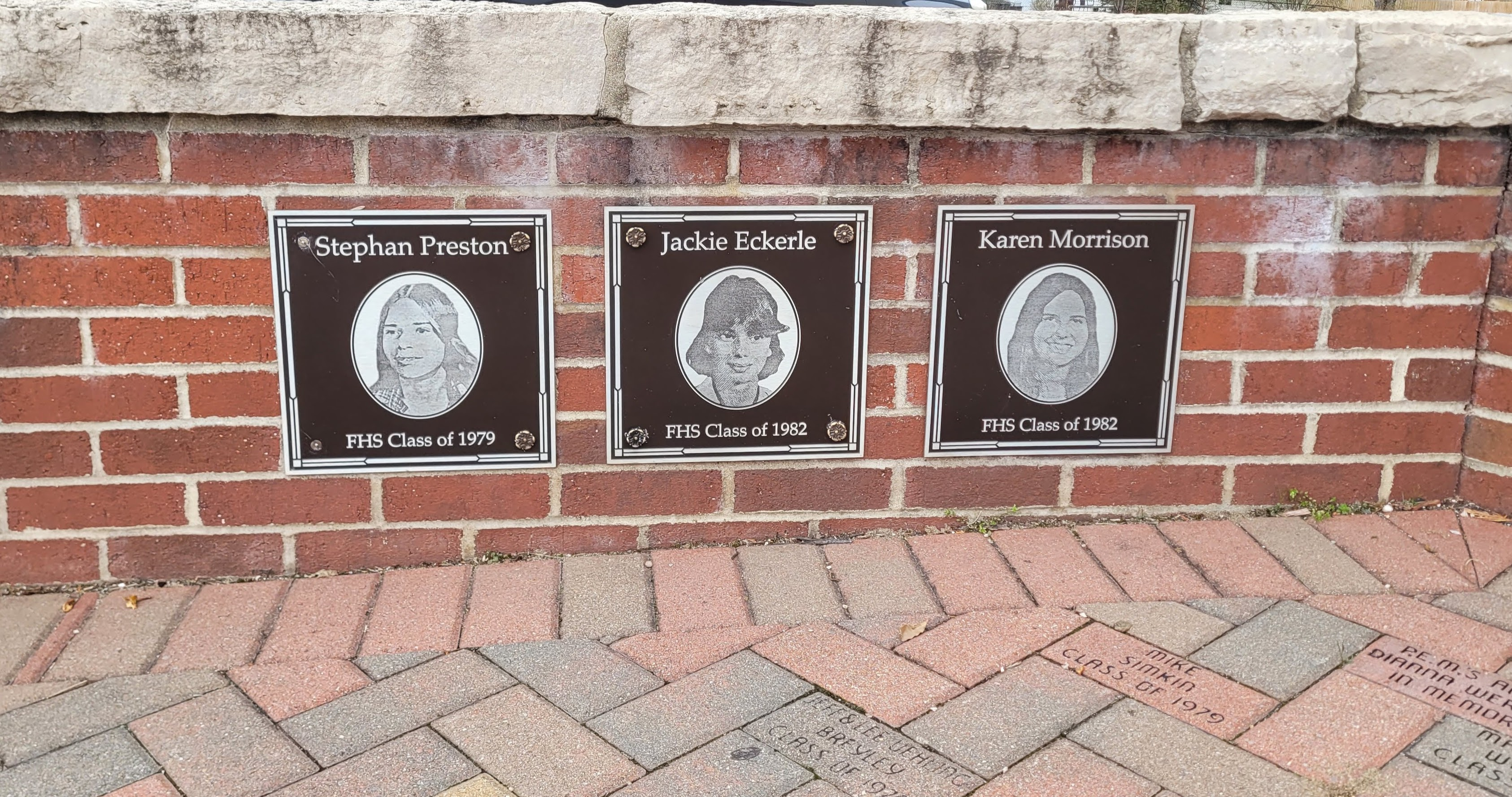
The portrait plaques of the three students of the PEM memorial at the Finneytown Secondary Campus

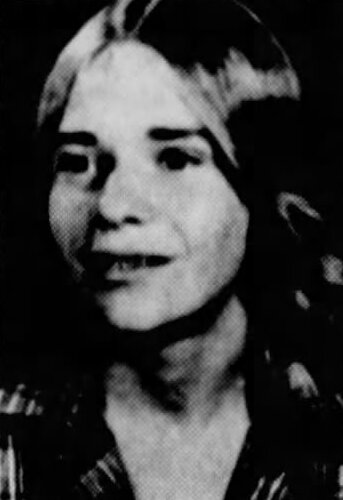
Stephan Preston

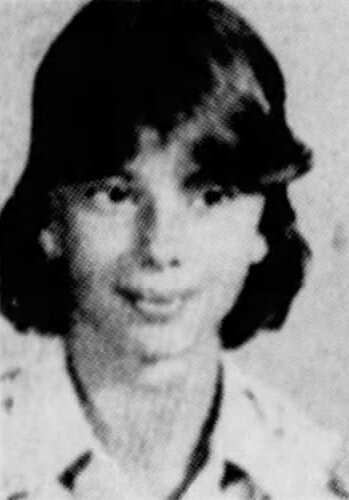
Jackie Ecklerle

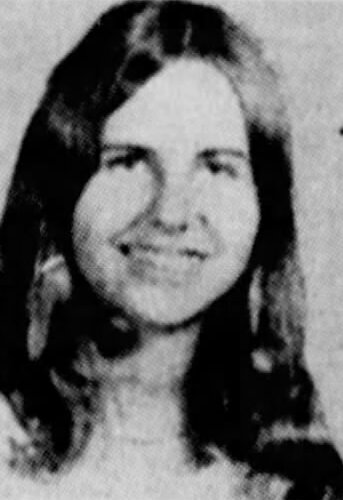
Karen Morrison

The three students that died at the 1979 The Who concert

== Notable alumni ==
- Aajonus Vonderplanitz '65 – nutritionist
- Jeffrey R. Immelt '74 – former CEO and chairman of the board, General Electric.
- Marco Marsan '75 – American author with three books.
- Douglas E. Richards '80 – New York Times bestselling author.
- Randall Einhorn '82 – television and film director, producer, and cinematographer, It's Always Sunny in Philadelphia, The Office (US)
- Amanda Borden '95 – 1996 Olympic Gold medalist in gymnastics.
- Donavon Clark '11 – professional football player for the Los Angeles Chargers.
