= Jermaine Mathews Jr. =

American football player (born 2005)

No. 7 – Ohio State Buckeyes
- Position: Cornerback
- Class: Senior

Personal information
- Born: March 28, 2005 (age 21)
- Listed height: 5 ft 11 in (1.80 m)
- Listed weight: 190 lb (86 kg)

Career information
- High school: Winton Woods (Forest Park, Ohio)
- College: Ohio State (2023–present)

Awards and highlights
- CFP national champion (2024); Freshman All-American (2023); Third-team All-Big Ten (2025)
- Stats at ESPN

Jermaine Mathews Jr. (born March 28, 2005) is an American college football cornerback for the Ohio State Buckeyes.

== Early life ==
Mathews Jr. attended Winton Woods High School in Forest Park, Ohio. As a senior, he had 51 tackles, six interceptions with three of them returned for a touchdown. He committed to Ohio State University to play college football.

== College career ==
Mathews Jr. earned playing time as a true freshman at Ohio State in 2023. He was named a freshman All-American.
