= Pleasant Run Farm, Ohio =

- Census-designated place
- Location in Hamilton County and the state of Ohio
- Coordinates: 39°18′06″N 84°32′58″W
- Country: United States
- State: Ohio
- County: Hamilton
- Township: Springfield

Area
  - Total: 1.06 sq mi (2.75 km^{2})
  - Land: 1.06 sq mi (2.75 km^{2})
  - Water: 0 sq mi (0.00 km^{2})
- Elevation: 764 ft (233 m)

Population (2020)
  - Total: 4,779
  - Density: 4,496.5/sq mi (1,736.12/km^{2})
- Time zone: UTC-5 (Eastern (EST))
  - Summer (DST): UTC-4 (EDT)
- FIPS code: 39-63618
- GNIS feature ID: 2393191

Pleasant Run Farm is a census-designated place (CDP) in Springfield Township, Hamilton County, Ohio, United States. The population was 4,779 at the 2020 census.

== History ==
Pleasant Run Farm is named after the Pleasant Run Farms [sic] residential subdivision, which hosted the Home Builders Association of Greater Cincinnati's fifth annual Homearama show in 1965. At 670 acres (270 ha), it was the largest subdivision approved by the Hamilton County Regional Planning Commission up to that time. An additional 100 homes were added to the subdivision beginning in 1967. The Pleasant Run Farms Civic Association was founded in 1969.

== Geography ==
Pleasant Run Farm is located northwest of Cincinnati, between Forest Park and Fairfield.

According to the United States Census Bureau, the CDP has a total area of 1.0 square miles (2.7 km^{2}), all land.

Pleasant Run is located to the west in neighboring Colerain Township.

== Demographics ==
Historical population
Census	Pop.	Note	%±
2020	4,779		—
U.S. Decennial Census

=== 2020 census ===
As of the 2020 census, Pleasant Run Farm had a population of 4,779. The population density was 4,495.77 people per square mile (1,736.12/km^{2}). The median age was 40.2 years. 23.4% of residents were under the age of 18, and 16.6% were 65 years of age or older. For every 100 females, there were 93.9 males, and for every 100 females age 18 and over, there were 86.7 males.

100.0% of residents lived in urban areas, while 0.0% lived in rural areas.

There were 1,751 households, of which 33.5% had children under the age of 18 living in them. Of all households, 50.1% were married-couple households, 14.1% were households with a male householder and no spouse or partner present, and 30.2% were households with a female householder and no spouse or partner present. About 23.1% of all households were made up of individuals, and 10.8% had someone living alone who was 65 years of age or older. The average household size was 2.44, and the average family size was 3.07.

There were 1,808 housing units, of which 3.2% were vacant. The homeowner vacancy rate was 1.3%, and the rental vacancy rate was 6.5%.

Racial composition as of the 2020 census
Race	Number	Percent
White	2,128	44.5%
Black or African American	2,022	42.3%
American Indian and Alaska Native	11	0.2%
Asian	182	3.8%
Native Hawaiian and Other Pacific Islander	8	0.2%
Some other race	152	3.2%
Two or more races	276	5.8%
Hispanic or Latino (of any race)	249	5.2%

=== Income and poverty ===
According to the U.S. Census American Community Survey, for the period 2016-2020 the estimated median annual income for a household in the CDP was $79,500, and the median income for a family was $89,957. About 5.1% of the population were living below the poverty line, including 3.6% of those under age 18 and 9.8% of those age 65 or over. About 58.5% of the population were employed, and 36.0% had a bachelor's degree or higher.

=== 2000 census ===
At the 2000 census there were 4,731 people, 1,637 households, and 1,314 families in the CDP. The population density was 4,511.4 inhabitants per square mile (1,741.9/km^{2}). There were 1,689 housing units at an average density of 1,610.6 per square mile (621.9/km^{2}). The racial makeup of the CDP was 74.13% White, 22.85% African American, 0.11% Native American, 1.37% Asian, 0.06% Pacific Islander, 0.36% from other races, and 1.12% from two or more races. Hispanic or Latino of any race were 0.68%.

Of the 1,637 households 45.7% had children under the age of 18 living with them, 63.8% were married couples living together, 13.1% had a female householder with no husband present, and 19.7% were non-families. 16.1% of households were one person and 4.6% were one person aged 65 or older. The average household size was 2.89 and the average family size was 3.25.

The age distribution was 31.3% under the age of 18, 9.1% from 18 to 24, 29.7% from 25 to 44, 23.3% from 45 to 64, and 6.6% 65 or older. The median age was 32 years. For every 100 females, there were 91.2 males. For every 100 females age 18 and over, there were 88.1 males.

The median household income was $61,359 and the median family income was $64,718. Males had a median income of $46,667 versus $30,085 for females. The per capita income for the CDP was $22,388. About 4.2% of families and 4.8% of the population were below the poverty line, including 6.7% of those under age 18 and 5.8% of those age 65 or over.
