= Aajonus Vonderplanitz =

American alternative nutritionist and activist (1947–2013)

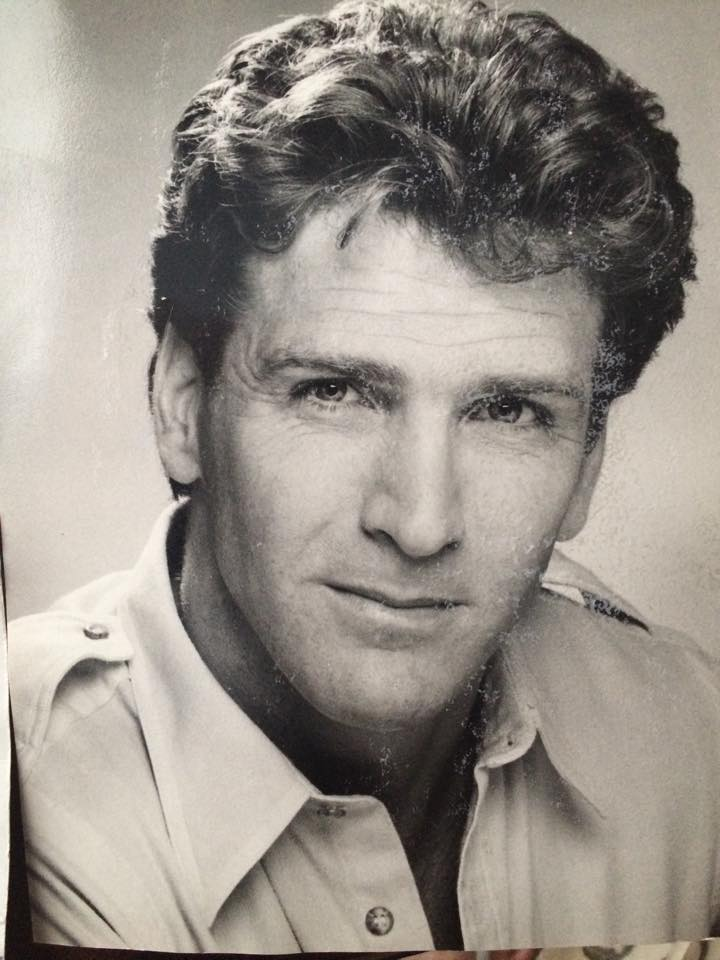
- Born: John Richard Swigart; April 17, 1947; Denver, Colorado, U.S.
- Died: August 28, 2013 (aged 66); Thailand
- Occupations: Alternative nutritionist and Food Activist

Aajonus Vonderplanitz (Born John Richard Swigart; April 17, 1947 – August 28, 2013) was an American alternative nutritionist and food-rights activist who focused on raw foods, particularly raw meat and dairy. He was a controversial figure who fought legal battles, implemented legal loopholes for consumer access to raw milk, and developed a diet based largely on raw meat: the primal diet. His later years, marked by his allegations of conspiracies and by his infighting within the raw food community, drew him notoriety even among advocates of alternative healthcare and food rights.

He claimed that he was diagnosed with terminal cancer in his early life, but later experienced remission and rejuvenation upon adopting a diet consisting of raw carrot juice and raw dairy by age 21. He later began informal nutritional counseling. By age 25, he had adopted a raw plant based diet; at age 29, he added raw meat, which he claimed vastly improved healing. After 1997, when his first book, We Want to Live, was published, he became a leading alternative nutritionist. He made miraculous claims of his clients' routinely curing their diseases, but did not publish any case documentation. His protocols are untested by medical scientists and remain controversial.

Vonderplanitz founded the nonprofit organization Right to Choose Healthy Foods (RTCHF). (Note: Charlie Donham, "Interview with Aajonus Vonderplanitz", Natural Health M2M, Oct 1998. The mere catalog of this print magazine, once published by raw-food group Natural Health, is preserved online by a third party at RawTimes.com, supplying the date. Yet the interview transcript is preserved online by another third party, Stanley S Bass, dating from 1999. Bass is a naturopath and chiropractor esteemed by Peter Keider, Ancient Secret of the Fountain of Youth, Book 2 (New York: Doubleday, 1999), p 205. This same transcript, yet apparently from an older version of Bass's website, is preserved online by Australian not-for-profit association Soil and Health Library, Inc. Both prefaces are signed Stanley S. Bass, Jan 2000, and the older also claims republication permission from Vonderplanitz and M2M.) In 2001, his effort led to the end of Los Angeles County's ban on the retail sale of raw milk. To circumvent laws banning sale of unpasteurized dairy elsewhere, he invented "animal leasing", (Note: Vondreplanitz claimed that this leasing model was more legally defensible than the rival model of a "herdshare" or "cowshare".) where a dairy farm is leased to a private food club, which elects to omit pasteurization. Vonderplanitz's legal defenses of RTCHF's farmers and club managers were mostly successful. By 2010, food clubs under RTCHF numbered about 80 across the United States, including a few with over 1000 members.

In 2010, Vonderplanitz accused a non-RTCHF farmer of misrepresenting food source and quality when supplying certain foods to RTCHF's preeminent food club Rawesome, which had been attracting celebrity membership, in Venice, Los Angeles. Waging negative publicity and a lawsuit against the farmer and Rawesome's owner, Vonderplanitz fostered the club's debacle while the government prosecuted the farmer and Rawesome's owner for distributing raw dairy. In 2013, at his farmhouse in rural Thailand, he fell through a faulty balcony rail and died a few days later.

== Biography ==
=== Early life ===
Vonderplanitz was born John Richard Swigart in Denver, Colorado. He spent most of his childhood and adolescence in the Cincinnati suburb of Finneytown, Ohio. He described himself as a misunderstood and abused sickly child. His older brother, allegedly resentful at the loss of maternal attention, "tortured [him] nearly daily". According to himself, being "dyslexic" and "borderline autistic", conditions "which no one understood at the time", Vonderplanitz "rarely played with other children", and "embarrassed and frustrated [his] parents", fueling paternal "discipline" that led to several hospitalizations.

Around his 10th birthday, Swigart claimed his alleged peritonitis was misdiagnosed as appendicitis, (Note: Vonderplanitz's account in the 2005 edition of his book We Want to Live suggests that peritonitis was never diagnosed by medical professionals but is Vonderplanitz's own retrospective diagnosis.) and his appendix was removed. He also stated that his bones were brittle, that he "regularly" broke limb bones, and that at age 15 he was diagnosed with "juvenile diabetes". Swigart first received family and community support, he recalled, when he found his first girlfriend in his junior year at Finneytown High School, whom he married two years later and had a child with. Once he graduated, the new family moved elsewhere near Cincinnati.

While renting a small apartment at a business intersection, Swigart's wife worked as a utility-company secretary, and he as a short-order cook while attending the Cincinnati Institute of Computer Technology. Their marriage was strained by their son's severe colic, her postpartum mood problems, his mood problems, and his extramarital affair with a female instructor at his trade school. They divorced when he was 19 and he moved to Los Angeles to work in computer programming.

=== Adulthood ===
Swigart developed a stomach ulcer, and the surgical treatment caused a keloidal scar that was treated by radiation therapy, which caused multiple myeloma. According to himself, once chemotherapy caused further illnesses, including psoriasis, bursitis, and severe periodontitis, he discontinued treatment of his terminal cancer, but a hospice worker, paying him volunteer home visits, gave him a small book on cancer treatment by raw carrot juice; within 10 days, the regimen ended his alleged dyslexia, and soon put his cancer in remission.

At age 22, Swigart began to promote himself as a nutritionist. About a year later, he met a toddler who called him Aajonus. Because he disliked his name, he accepted the new one and later took his European ancestors' last name, Vonderplanitz. He mostly attributed his health gains over the next two years to raw juices and raw dairy. By age 25, Vonderplanitz adopted a raw plant based diet. Two years later, he travelled by bicycle in search for answers to nutrition while "liv[ing] off the earth" across North America and into Latin America. Nearly three years later, he returned to Los Angeles with a proposed solution: eating raw meat.

Vonderplanitz claimed a diverse résumé, as by the time he was 40, he still had marginal income as a nutritionist. He recalled that in 1971, he refused to be made the Winston Man for seven years, which he claimed would have earned him $7.5 million. (Note: In a published letter replying, he explained, to a client's own letter to him, Vonderplanitz writes, "I could have compromised many times and made fortunes. I wrote a diet for a woman named Judy. It was for a certain period of her life, for her to temporarily lose weight. Judy wrote a book of the diet called the Beverly Hills Diet and made a fortune. That diet is harmful to the nervous system if followed for more than a few days or weeks. It often made people very testy and/or irritable. Many people who followed that diet damaged their nervous systems, family relationships and friendships. I refused to do that harm to people for money. In 1971, on moral principle, I refused to be the Winston Man in commercials, rejecting $7.5 million over the next seven years" (Vonderplanitz 2005, p. 207).) In the 1980s, he earned money painting murals inside homes and acting on the soap opera General Hospital. He claimed to have created a diet for a client demanding quick weight loss who allegedly published it for profit as the Beverly Hills Diet. After overturning a traffic ticket at age 22, he sought to develop legal expertise by private study. After 2000, he wrote business contracts and legal responses for farmers. In his last years, he owned a farm in the Philippines and another in a remote area of Thailand, near its northern border with Laos.

== Nutritional career ==
Vonderplanitz claimed to have been tutored by a Southern California nutritionist named Bruno Corigliano, after which he travelled by bicycle across North America and into Latin America in his late 20s while studying biology and medical textbooks, Native American indigenous healthcare, and wildlife habits. He claimed to have discovered raw meat's putative healing capacity when fasting in the wilderness, where a pack of coyotes killed, tore open, and offered him a jackrabbit, then watched him until he ate it.

In his early 20s, among the outdoor purveyors at Venice Beach, he set up a table with the banner NUTRITIONIST, and began counseling in a raw-food niche. In hindsight, he claimed that his advice had often been ineffective, and sometimes even harmful until he included raw meat. Around age 30, he became a staff nutritionist, advising customers, at a health food store, Aunt Tilly's Too. Although not in his 1997 book, he used the title PhD, specifying nutritional science, in a 2001 research report on milk, cowritten with William Campbell Douglass II MD and thereafter. In 2009, he was reported to lack accredited scientific or medical training.

In September 1986, Vonderplanitz returned to Cincinnati, Ohio, after living in a Beverly Hills "slum" while freelancing in nutrition. His son, estranged for about 20 years, had been in a severe car wreck, and drove straight into a tree without a seatbelt. Vonderplanitz claimed to have sabotaged his son's conventional medical treatment in Mercy Hospital's intensive care unit, and used raw foods to awaken and save his comatose son from imminent death, and to reverse his paralysis and brain damage.

Upon the 1997 release of Vonderplanitz's first book, We Want To Live, Robert Atkins interviewed him on Atkins's nationally syndicated radio show. Vonderplanitz claimed his own protocol had cured over 200 clients of cancer. In 2000, Vonderplanitz trademarked the name Primal Diet. Unlike later diets called "primal", (Note: For instance, there is Mark Sisson's "Primal Blueprint" diet, sometimes called the "primal diet", that Sisson developed in 2009 [Lambeth Hochwald, "Paleo vs. primal diet: What's the difference?", Mother Nature Network website, 28 May 2015].) Vonderplanitz's Primal Diet principally includes raw meat, raw eggs, raw dairy, raw fats, and unheated honey. In 2002, his other book, the Recipe for Living Without Disease, was published. Around 2010, he claimed a higher-than-90 percent rate of cancer remission among his clients who followed it. Despite mainstream dismissal, his Primal Diet gained a sizable underground following.

== Food activism ==
Although Vonderplanitz dated it to the 1970s, his food-rights campaign more clearly began closer to 2000. In 2011, Vonderplanitz and an ally, James Stewart, were the raw-milk movement's de facto leaders.

=== California ===
In 1997 or 1998, Venice, Los Angeles, resident James Stewart, in poor health, discovered Vonderplanitz's Primal Diet. By 2000, Stewart was a southern California distributor of raw milk for Claravale Farm, which had only eight cows, but was the state's only farm still licensed to supply unpasteurized milk to retail stores. While Claravale Farm added cows for Stewart's distribution reaching 30 stores in four counties—Orange, Ventura, San Diego, and Los Angeles—one county, Los Angeles, was the only one in the state where the retail sale of raw milk was illegal. By 2001, county regulators were pulling Stewart's milk from stores.

In 2001, Vonderplanitz drew Stewart to help demonstrations and protests, although initial turnout was minuscule. Later in 2001, Vonderplanitz's report on raw milk cowritten with William Campbell Douglass II and accompanying threat of legal action, persuaded the county's board of supervisors to end the ban on raw milk's retail sale. The hearings were highly publicized and fueled consumer demand for unpasteurized dairy. Claravale Farm's supply via Stewart was insufficient, and southern California residents travelled north to buy raw milk at the McAfee brothers' farm, Organic Pastures Dairy Company. In early 2000, the McAfees' farm had switched to organic, but Organic Pastures still sold its milk wholesale to Organic Valley, which in turn supplied only pasteurized milk to stores.

After visits by southern Californian customers, Organic Pastures obtained a permit to sell raw dairy retail. In 2001, Mark McAfee contacted Stewart, who recruited Vonderplanitz. Vonderplanitz invested $15,000, and with Stewart recruited others, including real-estate executive Larry Otting who invested $17,000, and Organic Pastures began to supply unpasteurized dairy retail. The volume allowed Stewart, despite dropping Claravale's milk, to reach 89 stores. In 2004, as the nation's largest unpasteurized supplier, Organic Pastures brought distribution in-house and dismissed Stewart, who then focused on growing his private food club, Rawesome. Rawesome kept Stewart and Vonderplanitz at the center of the raw-dairy movement until Rawesome's closure after a government raid in 2011.

=== Nationwide ===
In the late 1990s, Vonderplanitz formed the nonprofit organization Right to Choose Healthy Food (RTCHF). Vonderplanitz claimed that the organization "will combat any legislation banning people's right to choose raw food", though RTCHF apparently focused on raw dairy. Vonderplanitz created the "animal-leasing" model, where a private food club, whose members are also RTCHF members, contracts a farmer to produce solely for that food club. As president of RTCHF, Vonderplanitz mediated these arrangements in multiple states. Meanwhile, he criticized the "herdshare" or "cowshare" model, where a consumer buys "shares" and thus "partially owns" the cattle, before buying dairy directly from the farmer, who may still sell to nonshareholders.

Vonderplanitz fought the Farm-to-Consumer Legal Defense Fund (FTCLDF) by writing legal documents for farmers and consumers, despite not being an attorney. The FTCLDF was operated by attorneys also endorsed the herdshare model, which Vonderplanitz claimed to lack precedent, as shareholding can entitle one to profits without any ownership of property, whereas leasing held long precedent of full responsibility matching ownership. Vonderplanitz not being a lawyer appealed to Amish farmers, however, who traditionally avoid taking legal action. By 2010, Vonderplanitz's responses were well known for ending regulators' legal threats against RTCHF's farmers. Once threatened, some non-RTCHF farmers signed RTCHF contracts. By 2010, RTCHF's food clubs numbered about 80, each commonly having about 100 to 200 members, and a few having over 1000 members.

Around 2010, the federal government began to pressure state governments to enforce laws against raw milk. A dragnet was brought against farmers and club managers connected to Vonderplanitz; his attempts to defend them drew mixed results. In April 2011, the Food and Drug Administration filed in federal court against Amish farmer Daniel Allgyer of Pennsylvania. Unable to reach Vonderplanitz, who was traveling abroad, Allgyer dropped Vonderplanitz's RTCHF the next month and hired Karl Dahlstrom's ProAdvocate Group. Against Allyger's resistance, Vonderplanitz filed a motion to intercede, but the judge denied it, excluding Vondeplanitz from the case, and added that Vonderplanitz's arguments about health and rights were irrelevant to whether Allgyer were guilty of interstate commerce of unpasteurized dairy. In February 2012, ruling against Allgyer, the judge called it "a cow share" that was "merely a subterfuge".

== Rawesome food club ==
The preeminent food club linked to Vonderplanitz's Right to Choose Healthy Food was the Rawesome food club, known for exotic raw foods, and its celebrity clientele, in Venice, Los Angeles. In 2001, James Stewart had founded a private food club, "The Garage". By 2003, it evolved into Rawesome, which Vonderplanitz wrote the contract for, invested in, and steered clients to. In 2005, regulators tried to restrict Rawesome, but Vonderplanitz wrote the response and persuaded Stewart to resist. The government dropped the citation, Rawesome continued normal operation, and the success gave Vonderplanitz renown for fending off regulators' legal threats over a few years. However, in October 2010, Vonderplanitz turned against Stewart, a conflict that divided the food club.

Having long thought that his body was responding poorly to some of her products, Vonderplanitz suspected Healthy Family Farms' owner Sharon Palmer, one of Rawesome's main suppliers, of secretly outsourcing, supplying meat that was not organic or soy-free, and providing contaminated eggs. Stewart stood by Palmer and kept selling her products. Vonderplanitz and Palmer's main creditor, Rawesome member Larry Otting, published a defamatory website, Unhealthy Family Farms. In June 2010, an unnamed Palmer employee explained to a Ventura County Sheriff's detective and a Los Angeles County District Attorney's agent that Healthy Family Farms lacked the means to produce all of the food it was supplying. Later that month, on June 30, regulators raided Rawesome.

Two days after the raid, Vonderplanitz sent a group email alleging that "government agents trespassed and kidnapped volunteers and members for the entire time that they seized the property, about five hours", and that "they stole, under the term confiscate, thousands of dollars worth of members' FOOD that was private property". A Los Angeles County District Attorney agent referred to Vonderplanitz's "online notices", argued to protect the investigation and to conceal identities of undercover agents, whose "lives and safety would be put into jeopardy", and persuaded a Los Angeles Superior Court judge to seal the investigation's documents. The Los Angeles District Attorney's office began monitoring Vonderplanitz, Palmer, and Palmer's employee Victoria Bloch's email accounts.

Although Rawesome continued normal operation and drew support in mainstream media, (Note: For instance, the television show The Colbert Report interviewed Rawesome's Stewart, satirized the raid, and brought out Senator Ron Paul who quipped, "It's pasteurization without representation" [Stephen Colbert, "Rawesome Foods raid", Colbert Report, Comedy Central, 6 Oct 2010, as discussed by (Gumpert 2013, p. 152)].) the raid intensified the Stewart–Vonderplanitz conflict, dividing Rawesome's membership, and conspiracy theories began to manifest. In late 2010, Vonderplanitz visited Ventura County District Attorney investigators to prosecute Palmer for allegedly defrauding Rawesome. In January 2011, Vonderplanitz and Otting sued Stewart and Palmer for $20 million. In August 2011, authorities raided Rawesome again and shut it down. They arrested Stewart, as well as Palmer and Bloch for criminal conspiracy in illegally producing and selling unpasteurized dairy.

Although he claimed credit for building Rawesome's success, Vonderplanitz was marginalized by Rawesome's supporters. Outside the courthouse at a demonstration, he, trying to answer interested news media, concluded himself blacklisted from newsgathering. In 2012, Stewart and Palmer were arrested on criminal charges as to the funding of Palmer's farm, where they allegedly misled investors about their own credit worthiness, and faced sentences of 40 years imprisonment. After four months of jail, Stewart took a plea deal, paid a fine, gave up Rawesome's cause, and began distributing olive oil. By July 2013, the civil suit's judge had reduced the 30 civil charges to two, Palmer countersued Vonderplanitz and Otting, and the judge ordered the parties to negotiate a settlement. By then, Vonderplanitz's seemingly irrational vendetta was infamous and was partially blamed for Rawesome's downfall.

== Last day ==
Despite his role in Rawesome and other animal-leasing arrangements that he continued after Rawesome's debacle, Vonderplanitz was never prosecuted. By 2010, he believed himself to be the target of a governmental or pharmaceutical conspiracy to neutralize him.

In 2009, he had described the ongoing flu pandemic as a hoax mediated by flu vaccination. He later alleged apparent retribution by invaders of his hotel room in Thailand forcibly giving him injections that sent his "mercury, barium, and chromium readings off the charts", impairing his health, causing weight loss, and prematurely aging him. In another claim, he said that his car's brakes suddenly failed in Thailand, causing a potentially fatal car wreck that he likewise attributed to a plot against his life.

In August 2013, at his farm in Thailand, Vonderplanitz apparently leaned against his second-story balcony rail, which collapsed; he fell and broke his spine, which paralyzed him. At the hospital, he accepted pain-killing drugs, yet refused surgery to treat internal bleeding. After a few days, he lost consciousness and died. Despite rumors of conspiracy, two of Vonderplanitz's colleagues described local circumstances suggesting a genuine accident. Vonderplanitz authored two books: a memoir retracing his path to and introducing the Primal Diet, We Want To Live (1997/2005), and a follow-up recipe book, The Recipe for Living Without Disease (2002).

== Bibliography ==
- Gumpert, David E (2013). Life, Liberty, and the Pursuit of Food Rights: The Escalating Battle Over Who Decides What We Eat. White River Junction VT: Chelsea Green Publishing. ISBN 9781603584050.
- Vonderplanitz, Aajonus (2005) [Originally published 1997]. We Want to Live: The Primal Diet (2nd ed.). Los Angeles: Carnelian Bay Castle Press. ISBN 9781889356105.
