= Pleasant Hills, Ohio =

- Census-designated place
- Interactive map of Pleasant Hills, Ohio
- Coordinates: 39°14′11″N 84°31′22″W
- Country: United States
- State: Ohio
- County: Hamilton

Area
  - Total: 0.36 sq mi (0.92 km^{2})
  - Land: 0.36 sq mi (0.92 km^{2})
  - Water: 0 sq mi (0.00 km^{2})
- Elevation: 791 ft (241 m)

Population (2020)
  - Total: 950
  - Density: 2,665.0/sq mi (1,028.97/km^{2})
- Time zone: UTC-5 (Eastern (EST))
  - Summer (DST): UTC-4 (EDT)
- FIPS code: 39-63548
- GNIS feature ID: 2585520

Pleasant Hills is a census-designated place (CDP) in Springfield Township, Hamilton County, Ohio, United States. The population was 950 at the 2020 census.

== Geography ==
Pleasant Hills is located 11 miles (18 km) north of downtown Cincinnati. It lies north of Finneytown, between the city of Mount Healthy to the west and Wyoming to the east.

According to the United States Census Bureau, the CDP has a total area of 0.35 square miles (0.9 km^{2}), all land.

== Demographics ==
Historical population
Census	Pop.	Note	%±
2020	950		—
U.S. Decennial Census

As of the census of 2020, there were 950 people living in the CDP, for a population density of 2,668.54 people per square mile (1,028.97/km^{2}). There were 479 housing units. The racial makeup of the CDP was 39.7% White, 53.6% Black or African American, 0.3% Native American, 1.6% Asian, 0.0% Pacific Islander, 1.7% from some other race, and 3.2% from two or more races. 1.7% of the population were Hispanic or Latino of any race.

There were 488 households, out of which 33.6% had children under the age of 18 living with them, 28.3% were married couples living together, 17.6% had a male householder with no spouse present, and 50.0% had a female householder with no spouse present. 27.2% of all households were made up of individuals, and 2.3% were someone living alone who was 65 years of age or older. The average household size was 2.59, and the average family size was 3.16.

26.2% of the CDP's population were under the age of 18, 45.2% were 18 to 64, and 28.6% were 65 years of age or older. The median age was 38.1. For every 100 females, there were 61.6 males.

According to the U.S. Census American Community Survey, for the period 2016-2020 the estimated median annual income for a household in the CDP was $58,656, and the median income for a family was $59,734. About 19.1% of the population were living below the poverty line, including 59.0% of those under age 18 and 0.0% of those age 65 or over. About 61.9% of the population were employed, and 35.0% had a bachelor's degree or higher.
