= Brandon Miree =

American football player (born 1981)

No. 21, 40
- Position: Fullback

Personal information
- Born: April 14, 1981 (age 45); Cincinnati, Ohio, U.S.
- Listed height: 6 ft 0 in (1.83 m)
- Listed weight: 236 lb (107 kg)

Career information
- High school: Winton Woods (Forest Park, Ohio)
- College: Alabama; Pittsburgh
- NFL draft: 2004: 7th round, 247th overall pick

Career history
- Denver Broncos (2004–2005); → Rhein Fire (2005); Green Bay Packers (2006)

Career NFL statistics
- Receptions: 9
- Receiving yards: 57
- Touchdowns: 0
- Stats at Pro Football Reference

Brandon Curtis Miree (born April 14, 1981) is an American former professional football player who was a fullback for the Green Bay Packers of the National Football League (NFL). He was selected by the Denver Broncos in the seventh round of the 2004 NFL draft. He played college football for the Alabama Crimson Tide and Pittsburgh Panthers.

== Early life ==
Miree was born in Cincinnati, Ohio and attended Winton Woods High School in Forest Park, Ohio.

== College career ==
Miree first played college football for the Alabama Crimson Tide from 1999 to 2001. He was redshirted in 1999. He rushed 94 times for 426 yards and six touchdowns in 2000. On September 12, 2001, it was reported that Miree had left the Alabama football team and was intending to transfer to another school.

Miree then transferred to play for the Pittsburgh Panthers from 2002 to 2003. He rushed 214 times for 943 yards and four touchdowns in 2002 while also catching 11 passes for 123 yards. He totaled 115 rushing attempts for 573 yards and six touchdowns, and 16 receptions for 130 yards and one touchdown his senior year in 2003.

== Professional career ==
=== Denver Broncos ===
Miree was selected by the Denver Broncos in the seventh round, with the 247th overall pick, of the 2004 NFL draft. He officially signed with the team on July 27, 2004. He was waived/injured on August 14 and reverted o injured reserve on August 16, 2004.

Miree was allocated to NFL Europe in 2005, where he played for the Rhein Fire during the 2005 NFL Europe season. He appeared in seven games, starting three, for the Fire, recording six receptions for 109 yards and one touchdown. He was waived by the Broncos on September 3, 2005, and signed to the team's practice squad on September 5, 2005. He signed a reserve/future contract with the Broncos on January 24, 2006. He was waived on September 2, 2006.

=== Green Bay Packers ===
Miree was signed to the practice squad of the Green Bay Packers on September 4, 2006. He was promoted to the active roster on September 26 and played in 10 games, starting three, for the Packers during the 2006 season, catching nine passes for 57 yards. He was waived on September 1, 2007.
