= James Whallon House =

Historic house in Ohio, United States

- U.S. National Register of Historic Places
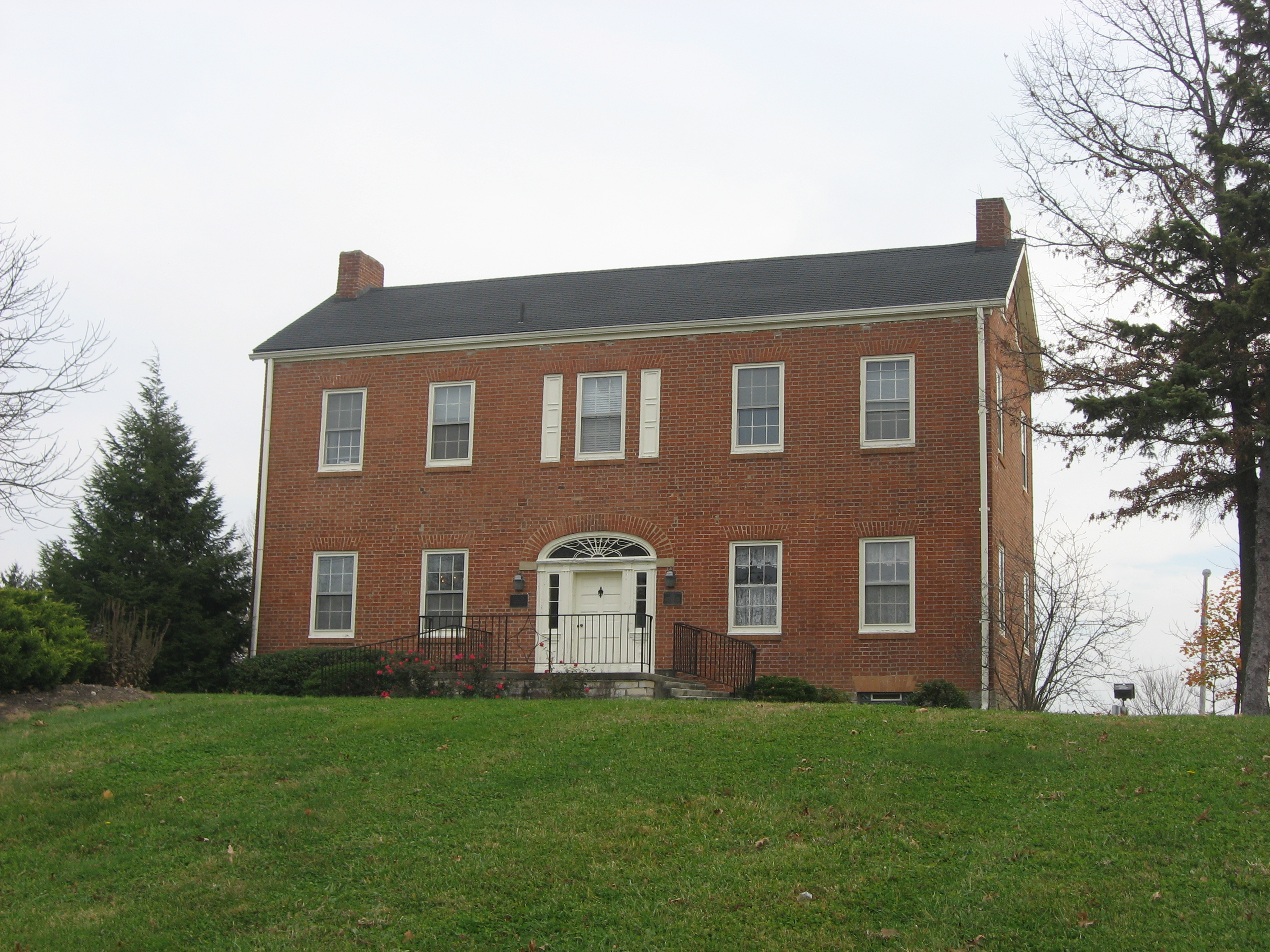
- Front of the Whallon House

- Location within Ohio Location within the United States
- Location: 11000 Winton Rd., Greenhills, Ohio
- Coordinates: 39°16′17″N 84°31′20″W
- Area: less than one acre
- Built: 1816
- Architectural style: Federal
- NRHP reference No.: 73001473
- Added to NRHP: May 17, 1973

The James Whallon House is a historic former farmhouse in the village of Greenhills near Cincinnati, Ohio, United States. It was at least the third Ohio home of James Whallon and his family, who settled in the region in 1800, purchased the land around the present house in 1806, and built a log cabin on the property before constructing the present house in 1816.

The Whallon House is a brick structure, two stories tall and topped with a gabled roof. After military service during the War of 1812, Whallon constructed the house himself, using clay to make the bricks by hand. James Whallon was a leading member of society into the second third of the nineteenth century. Besides farming, he operated a distillery that produced whiskey and brandy, and he held office as a justice of the peace from 1818 to 1835. In his later years, he joined the temperance movement (and consequently closed his distillery) and participated in education, building a school on the site of his log cabin.

Since Whallon's lifetime, his house has served a variety of purposes. For a time, it was the home of George Marquardt, but it has since ceased to be used for residential purposes; in the third quarter of the twentieth century, it was used as a community center. During the Great Depression, the village of Greenhills was constructed as a planned community; putting the former Winton Road farmhouse within the village. Today, the house at 11000 Winton Road is the location of the Greenhills village offices.

In 1973, the James Whallon House was listed on the National Register of Historic Places. It qualified for inclusion both because of its well-preserved historic Federal architecture and because of its connection to James Whallon.
