= Maalik Bomar =

American gridiron football player (born 1990)

No. 46
- Position: Linebacker

Personal information
- Born: August 1, 1990 (age 36); Cincinnati, Ohio, U.S.
- Listed height: 6 ft 1 in (1.85 m)
- Listed weight: 226 lb (103 kg)

Career information
- High school: Winton Woods

Career history
- 2013: Jacksonville Jaguars*
- 2014–2015: Calgary Stampeders
- 2016: Edmonton Eskimos*
- * Offseason or practice squad member only

Awards and highlights
- Grey Cup champion (2014)
- Stats at CFL.ca

Maalik Bomar (born August 1, 1990) is an American former professional football linebacker. He is a Grey Cup champion, having won with the Calgary Stampeders in 2014.

== Early career ==
Bomar played high school football as an outside linebacker and wide receiver at Winton Woods High School from 2006 to 2008. He was a team captain for two years and was named Most Valuable Player in 2008.

From 2009 to 2012, Bomar played for the Cincinnati Bearcats of the University of Cincinnati as a linebacker and on special teams. Over four seasons, he totaled 223 tackles, one sack, one interception, and one touchdown.

== Professional career ==
Bomar was signed by the Jacksonville Jaguars of the National Football League on April 28, 2013, as an undrafted free agent. He was released on August 25. Bomar worked out with the Cincinnati Bengals in early September 2013, but the Bengals did not sign him.

On May 27, 2014, Bomar was signed by the Calgary Stampeders. He spent time on the practice squad roster before being activated for the Week 4 game against the Hamilton Tiger-Cats. He played three games and recorded two special teams tackles and a fumble recovery in his rookie year. Bomar was active for the Grey Cup. He was released by the Stampeders on May 25, 2015.
