= Finneytown Local School District =

School district in Ohio

Coordinates: 39°13′46.6″N 84°30′59.5″W

Address
- 8791 Brent Drive Cincinnati, Ohio, 45231; United States

District information
- Type: Public
- Grades: K–12
- NCES District ID: 3904733

Students and staff
- Students: 1,259
- Teachers: 83.44
- Staff: 187.24
- Student–teacher ratio: 15.09

Other information
- Website: www.finneytown.org

Finneytown Local School District is a school district headquartered at the Finneytown Secondary Campus in Finneytown, Springfield Township, Hamilton County, Ohio, in the Cincinnati metropolitan area. The Finneytown School District serves the entirety of Finneytown. The current schools in the district are:

- Finneytown Secondary Campus — 7th-12th grade
- Finneytown Elementary School — K-6th grade

== History ==
The first building that was used exclusively as a school in Finneytown was built in 1860. The building was a one-room structure and at one point served as the school to over 60 children. In 1880, this first school was expanded to a have two rooms. In 1905, Special District School #10 was created though a petition and the first board of education was elected for the school. A new brick building with two rooms, a gymnasium/auditorium, a basement lunchroom, and a furnace room was built in 1915.

In 1930, Telford Whitaker became the acting principal of the school and he saw the school district change from the small brick building to the district having multiple school buildings. Whitaker Elementary (named after Telford Whitaker) was built in 1935 as a two-story building and housed 1-8th grades. Before the high school was built, Finneytown students had to go to Hughes, Mt. Healthy, or Wyoming after completing eighth grade. During the late 1940s and 1950s, the population of Finneytown increased by 368%, thus increasing the demand for a local high school. The Finneytown Secondary Campus opened to its first freshman class in 1958, which initially consisted of three buildings. Over the years the secondary campus was expanded to include another building with classrooms, an auditorium, a gymnasium, and hallways to connect the buildings. With Finneytown's population increase, Cottonwood Elementary was built in 1962 and was quickly followed by Brent Elementary in 1964. In 1965, Telford Whitaker retired.

By 1986, student enrollment decreased in Finneytown, which led to the district leasing Brent Elementary to Springfield Township as a community center. Student enrollment increased after a decade and the district reclaimed control over Brent for it to be used an elementary school again. Eventually Cottonwood Elementary was torn down in 2010 due to difficulty of maintenance. Due to the age of the schools and the difficulty of maintenance, Finneytown residents passed a bond issue in 2019 for a construction of a new high school and elementary school to replace the old buildings. The new elementary school, named Finneytown Elementary, was completed and opened to students in 2022. Also in 2022, Ohio approved fundings for the construction for the new high school, which will house middle school as well.

Schools of the Finneytown School District

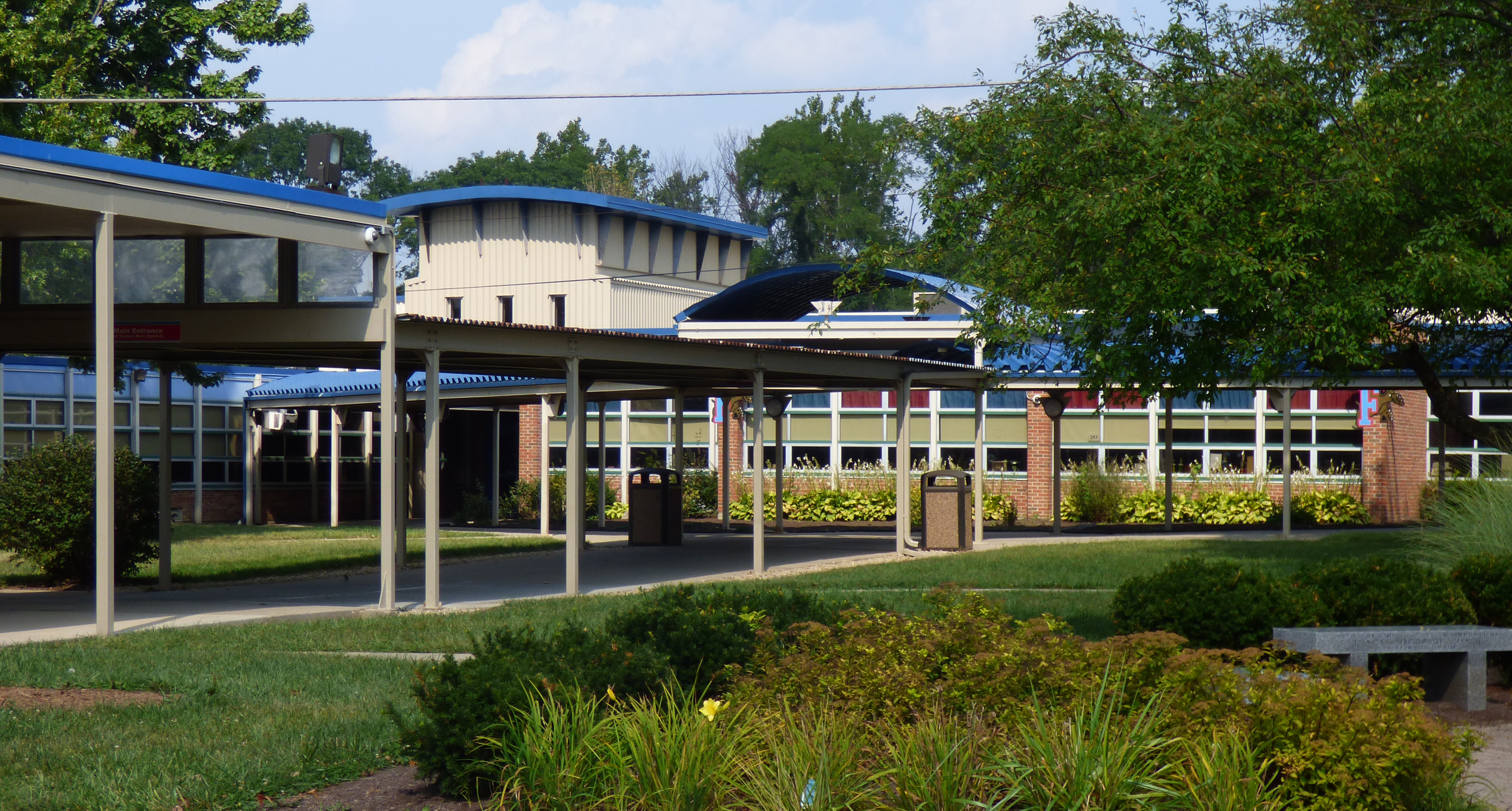
Finneytown Secondary Campus

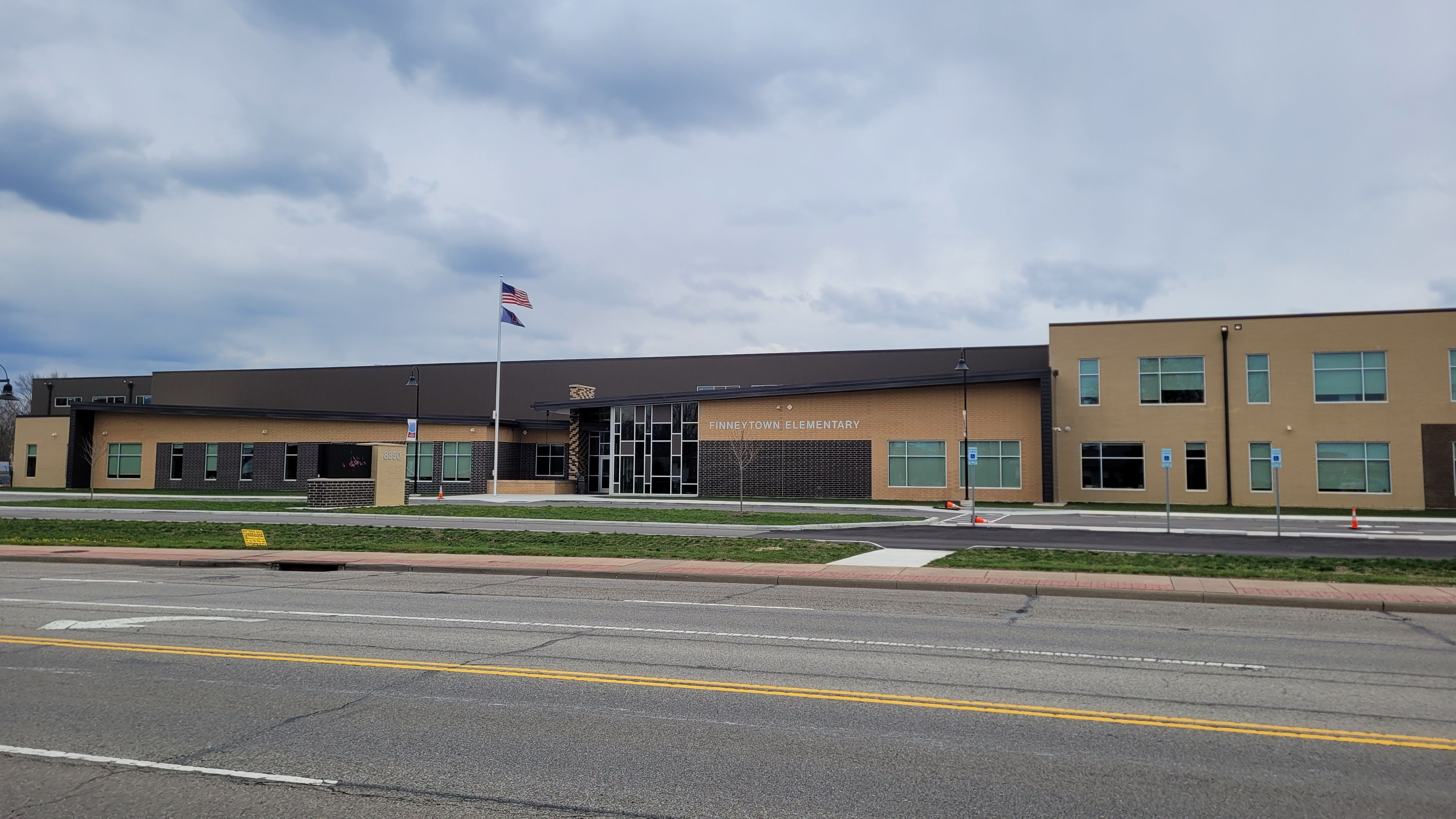
Finneytown Elementary
