= Donavon Clark =

American football player (born 1992)

No. 63, 76
- Position: Offensive guard

Personal information
- Born: November 12, 1992 (age 33); Cincinnati, Ohio, U.S.
- Listed height: 6 ft 4 in (1.93 m)
- Listed weight: 315 lb (143 kg)

Career information
- High school: Finneytown (Springfield Township, Ohio)
- College: Michigan State
- NFL draft: 2016: 7th round, 224th overall pick

Career history
- San Diego / Los Angeles Chargers (2016–2017)
- Stats at Pro Football Reference

Donavon Clark (born November 12, 1992) is an American former professional football offensive guard. He played college football at Michigan State.

== Professional career ==
Clark was selected by the San Diego Chargers in the seventh round with the 224th overall pick of the 2016 NFL draft. On August 30, 2016, Clark was placed on injured reserve.

On September 2, 2017, Clark was waived/injured by the Chargers and placed on injured reserve.

On July 25, 2018, Clark was waived by the Chargers.
