= Winton Woods City School District =

School district in Ohio, United States

Winton Woods City Schools
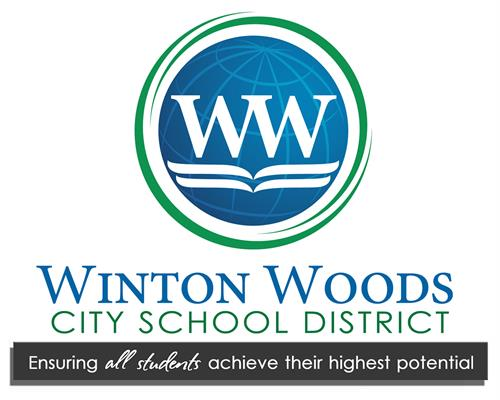

Address
- 825 Waycross Rd Suite A Cincinnati, Ohio, 45240; United States
- Coordinates: 39°17′11″N 84°31′13″W

District information
- Type: Public
- Motto: "Cultivating a World Class Education"
- Grades: PK–12
- Established: 1905; 121 years ago
- President: Brandon Smith
- Superintendent: Steve K. Denny
- NCES District ID: 3904408

Students and staff
- Students: 3,985 (2025–2026)
- Teachers: 226.83 (on an FTE basis) (2025–2026)
- Staff: 700.12 (on an FTE basis) (2025–2026)
- Student–teacher ratio: 17.57 (2025–2026)
- District mascot: Warrior
- Colors: Green and Blue

Other information
- Website: www.wintonwoods.org

Winton Woods City School District is a city school district in northern Hamilton County, Ohio, United States. Winton Woods serves students living in Forest Park, Greenhills, and Springfield Township.

The school district was renamed Winton Woods when Greenhills and Forest Park High Schools were merged in 1991 for the 1991–92 school year. The district's general offices are located at 1215 W. Kemper Rd. in Forest Park, next to the high school.

The current superintendent is Steve K. Denny.

== About ==
In 2014, the district and 5 other Ohio school districts were involved in a scandal over academic data, which they had altered to improve performance ratings. Their performance rating was later revised from an 89.6 to an 89.4.

The district has recently switched to the New Tech Network.

== Schools ==
- Winton Woods High School @ North Campus - Grades 9-12
- Middle School @ North Campus - Grades 7-8
- Intermediate School @ South Campus - Grades 5-6
- Elementary School @ South Campus - Grades 3-4
- Primary School @ South Campus - Grades 1-2
- Winton Woods Early Childhood Central Campus - Grades Pre-K to K

=== Closed schools ===
- Damon Road Elementary School (Greenhills)
- Beechwoods Elementary School (Greenhills)
- Forest View Elementary School (Forest Park in 'H' section)
- Cameron Park Elementary School (Forest Park in 'C' section)
- Kemper Heights Elementary School (Forest Park in 'G' section)
- Winton Forest Elementary School (Forest Park in 'K' section)
- Lakeside Elementary School (Springfield Township, located south of Winton Lake)
- Greenhills Middle School (Greenhills, located directly behind Greenhills Shopping Center)
- Greenhills High School (Greenhills, located where Winton Woods South Campus is located)
- Forest Park Middle School (Forest Park, located where Early Childhood Central Campus and the district offices are located)
- Forest Park High School (Forest Park, located where Winton Woods North Campus is located)
