= Raw Farm =

American milk and dairy producer

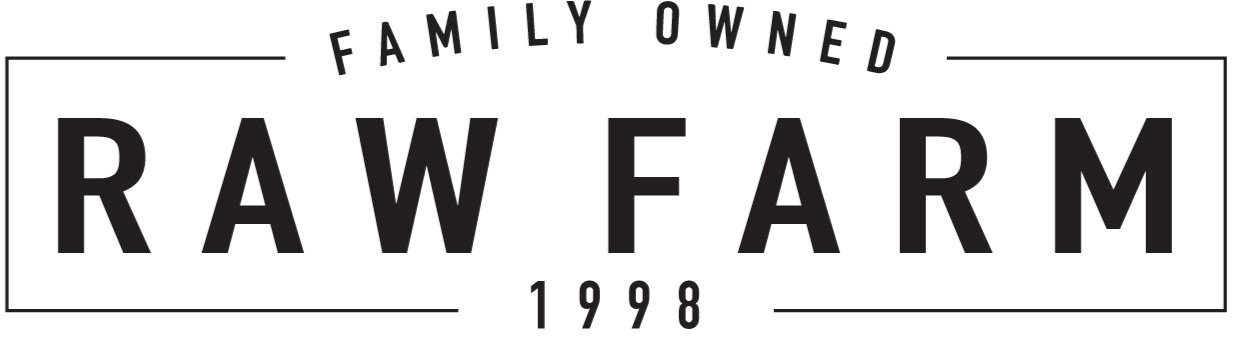
- Formerly: Organic Pastures
- Industry: Raw milk and dairy production
- Founded: 1998
- Founder: Mark McAfee
- Headquarters: United States

Raw Farm, formerly known as Organic Pastures, is an American company that produces raw milk (milk that has not undergone pasteurization to be removed of pathogens) or dairy products made with raw milk. Their products are made in Fresno and Kings counties in California.

The company has made controversy over their products sometimes being contaminated with Campylobacter, Salmonella, E. coli, or bird flu, resulting from the lack of pasteurization. They have also faced legal troubles for violating federal law regarding the distribution and marketing of raw milk.

== History ==
Raw Farm, formerly named Organic Pastures, was founded by Mark McAfee in 1998. The company's sales have grown in recent years, as more people have started consuming raw food or drink products for various reasons. Proponents of raw products say they taste better and are more healthy than pasteurized products; in the latter case, scientists do not agree that they are healthier, because the pasteurization process removes pathogens which can cause illnesses. Public health officials warned consumers in March 2024 to not drink raw milk, after bird flu virus was found in dairy cows in the United States; despite this, the company's sales significantly increased in the months afterward. In June 2024, McAfee said that Raw Farm was selling 80,000 gallons of their milk a week, and that the increased in sales came from changing dietary trends and social media attention. According to McAfee, as of January 2025, Raw Farm's Raw Milk brand is sold at 500 stores in California.

There is a political angle to some people who are buying Raw Farm's products, motivated by distrust in the government; McAfee said in May 2024, "Anything that the [Food and Drug Administration (FDA)] tells our customers to do, they do the opposite." The Raw Milk brand is favored by Robert F. Kennedy Jr., an attorney and activist who is the U.S. Secretary of Health and Human Services. At the request of Kennedy's 2024 presidential campaign running mate Nicole Shanahan, McAfee has been asked to work at the FDA as a "raw milk adviser".

In 2026, investigative journalist, Annie Waldman, met with McAfee at his farm right outside of Fresno to discuss the years of allegations against Raw Farm, and to get deeper insights into the man and operations behind it for a story that first published in ProPublica on June 9, 2026 and then CNN on June 15, 2026. McAfee freely acknowledged that Raw Farm produced milk contaminated with pathogens that was not thrown away (except for milk with salmonella, which was either discarded or later pasteurized ) but used to make Raw Farm's cheese products. Despite the FDA demanding he stop, McAfee explained that it was done under the belief that "...cheese is resistant to pathogens," which is not true. In 2024, Julie Panelli, who ate tacos made from Raw Farm's cheddar cheese purchased at a Newport Beach, California grocery store was diagnosed with an E. coli infection that severely damaged her kidneys, requiring surgery. She developed a phobia of eating after the incident. A lawsuit is ongoing. The piece also documented an incident in which McAfee snuck into an ICU by using his old paramedic credentials and "sucked up" to nurses to gain access to a child thought to be sickened by his milk in order to gather first-hand information. After the visit McAfee claimed that “he’s eating McDonald’s, watching cartoons, doing just great, and they’re telling the story to the world that he’s ready to die. I was really upset about that.” The child's mother explained that would have been impossible because at the time of McAfee's visit her child had just been taken off of a ventilator.

=== Health and legal incidents ===
In 2006, the California Department of Food and Agriculture (CDFA) temporarily quarantined milk and cream from Organic Pastures that were contaminated with E. coli, after four children received contracted the bacteria from the products.

In April 2010, Organic Pastures was found by the U.S. Department of Justice (DOJ) to have violated a 2007 federal law on "introducing and/or distributing raw milk into interstate commerce" and promoting "unapproved raw drugs", the latter resulting from Organic Pastures advertising their products as health cures. An injunction was imposed on Organic Pastures which was supposed to limit their ability to violate the 2007 law. In March 2022, the DOJ alleged that Raw Farm was engaging in civil contempt by defying the 2010 injunction, and in July 2023, in the U.S. District Court for the Eastern District of California, Mark McAfee and Raw Farm pleaded guilty to misdemeanor charges of "introduction and delivery for introduction into interstate commerce of misbranded food".

On January 8, 2022, a Raw Farm creamery was burned down in an act of arson by an unknown person. A $10 million dollar loan backed by the U.S. Department of Agriculture was given to Raw Farm to build a new creamery.

In May 2023, the CDFA issued a recall of Raw Farm's Raw Milk after the CDFA found Campylobacter bacteria in milk from a Raw Farm packaging facility.

In August 2023, California State Veterinarian Dr. Annette Jones issued a recall of Raw Farm's Raw Cheddar cheese products after Salmonella was found by the CDFA in a Raw Farm packaging facility. The Raw Cheese brand is made of whole raw milk.

In October 2023, 19 cases of Salmonella were reported in San Diego and Orange counties in California, linked to Raw Farm's Raw Milk. The products were recalled by the CDFA.

In February 2024, 10 people in the United States were infected with E. coli that had come from contaminated Raw Farm's Raw Cheddar. Four of the people who contracted E. coli were hospitalized, one of them developing hemolytic uremic syndrome. The Centers for Disease Control warned consumers not to buy the Raw Cheddar brand, while Raw Farm issued a voluntary recall the products. Raw Farm said none of their products had been found to have E. coli when they tested it.

In November 2024, bird flu virus was found to have contaminated some of Raw Farm's Raw Milk sold in California. The company issued a voluntary recall of the affected products. The California Department of Public Safety said that no illnesses were found in conjunction with the batch, but warned consumers against buying the brand. In December, California suspended the distribution of Raw Farm's Raw Milk to halt the spread of bird flu.

==== Investigations into 2025–2026 E. coli outbreak ====
On March 15, 2026, the U.S. Department of Health and Human Services' (HHS's) Centers for Disease Control and Prevention (CDC) and Food and Drug Administration (FDA) and certain state public health officials announced an investigation into a multistate outbreak of toxic E. coli O157:H7 infections linked to raw (unpasteurized) cheese and milk sold by RAW FARM, LLC (Raw Farm). The investigation confirmed nine E. coli cases in three states between September 2025 and February 2026, with the majority of illnesses occurring in children under five.

On April 2, 2026, after initially refusing, Raw Farm voluntarily recalled certain raw cheddar cheese products and stated it "disputes being the cause of this outbreak." Raw Farm, the largest raw milk farm in the country, reported that this recall impacted approximately $1.5 million of its product. The farm was identified by CDC and FDA as the likely source of a similar 2024 E. coli outbreak. According to CDC, children under five, adults 65 and older, and people with compromised immune systems are at a higher risk of becoming ill with a toxic E. coli infection, which can cause serious health conditions. Raw dairy products, compared with pasteurized products, generally are associated with a higher risk of foodborne illness, including E. coli infection.

Some House Members of the Congressional Food Safety Caucus urged FDA and Raw Farm to remove the outbreak-linked products from the market and indicated openness to strengthening FDA's mandatory recall authority, if needed.
