= Marco Marsan =

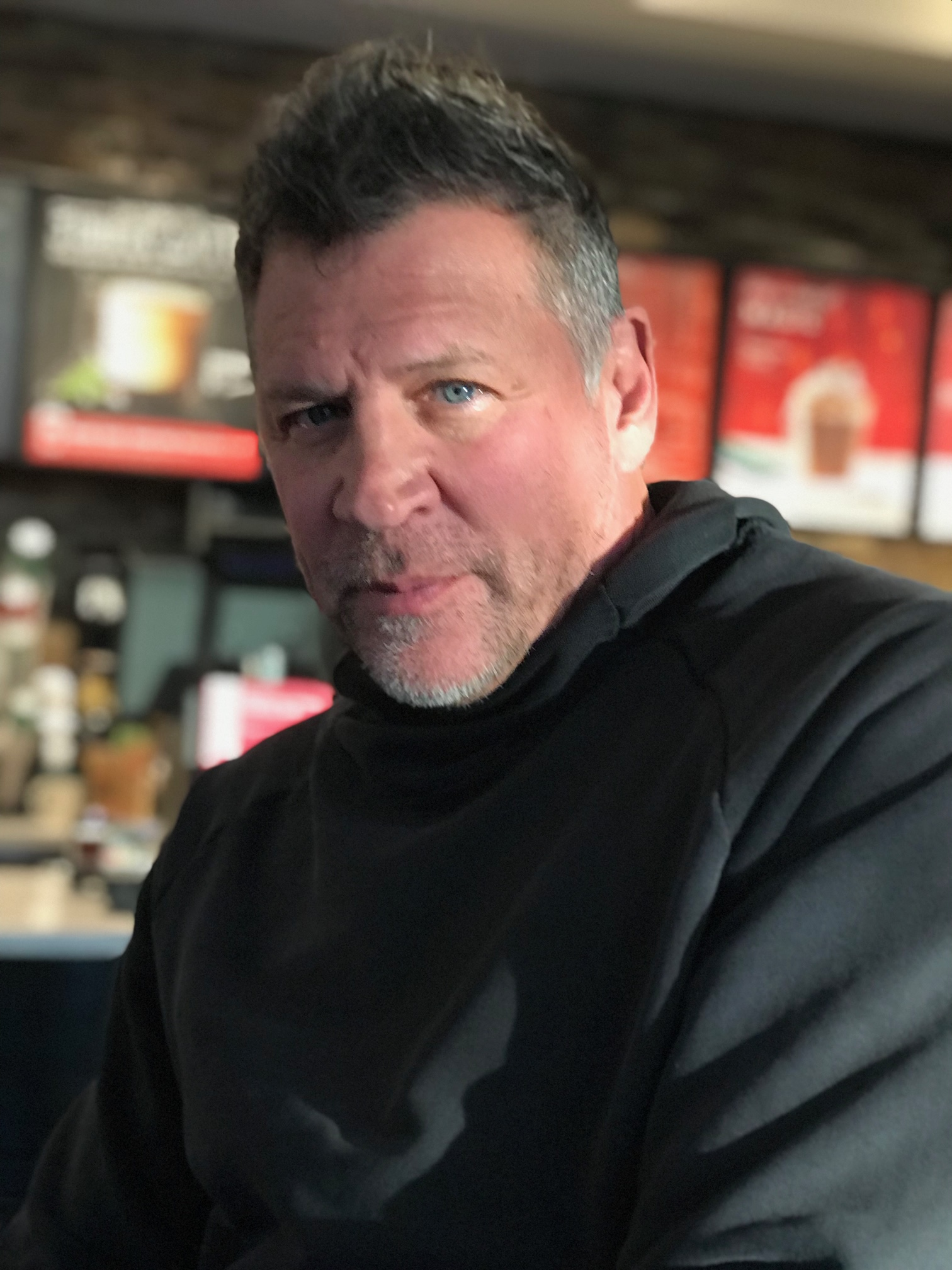
- Born: 25 June 1957 (age 69); Windsor, Ontario, Canada
- Occupations: Novelist, Marketer
- Writing career
- Notable works: The Lions Way; Think Naked
- Website: marcopoloexplorers.com

Marco Marsan (born June 25, 1957 in Windsor, Ontario) is a Canadian-born American author and founder of an innovation and branding consultancy. He wrote the novel The Lion's Way, and the non-fiction works: Who Are You When Nobody's Looking and Think Naked: Childlike Brilliance in the Rough Adult World. He was named one of America's Top Out of the Box thinkers by the Mazda Corporation in 1999. Marco Marsan has also made appearances on The View and The Montel Williams Show.

Marco is a veteran of the United States Air Force, serving in 1975-76 as an information specialist. He graduated from Finneytown High School in 1975, the same school that produced General Electric CEO Jeff Immelt and Nestlé CEO Brad Alford. Marco led his team to the Ohio State men's soccer championship in 1974, and then attended the University of Cincinnati where he received a bachelor's degree in Business in 1983.

Marco is a citizen of Canada, Italy and the United States. His father Mario Marsan (an Italian immigrant in 1958) is credited with having invented the design for the hourglass shape of the disposable diaper in 1964 while working for Procter & Gamble and his uncle, the famed opera singer Italo Tajo, was featured on several recordings with Luciano Pavarotti, José Carreras and Plácido Domingo.

Marco was awarded the "Top 5 Speaker in Innovation / Creativity" designation in 2010 by Speakers Platform, as well as taught classes on innovation and entrepreneurship at both Xavier University's Williams School of Business and University of Cincinnati's Lindner School of Business.

Marco was credited in the Guinness Book of World Records for over 4 years with having created the world's largest Chicken Dance in which 43,000 participants danced at Oktoberfest Zinzinnati in Cincinnati, Ohio on Sept 9, 1992.

He now resides in Henderson, Nevada.

== Published works ==
- Who Are You When Nobody's Looking (1999) ISBN 978-1-86204-593-4
- Think Naked (2003) ISBN 978-1-58872-042-9
- The Lion's Way with Peter Lloyd (2008) ISBN 978-1-929774-46-3

== Notable creations ==
=== Pepsi Blue ===
To appeal to different sub-segments of their consumer base, Pepsi sought innovation based upon targeted cultural and flavor trends. This led to the creation of Pepsi Blue.

=== Trident Layers Gum ===
Cadbury Adams wanted to leverage their scientific expertise and breakthrough technologies to create much-needed news and sales growth in the gum and mints category through their powerhouse brands Trident and Dentyne. Using newly created layering technology, this concept became Trident Layers Gum.

=== Capital One Spark Card ===
The idea for the Capital One SPARK Business Card extended beyond a simple credit card. The concept was built to leverage Capital One’s economies of scale with data, presence in social media, and financial analytics to help Small Business with big business know-how, cash flow and a larger voice.

=== Absolut 100 ===
Developed initially as Absolut Onx, this concept evolved into Absolut 100, a higher-ABV vodka.
