= Greenhills, Ohio =

Greenhills
- Village
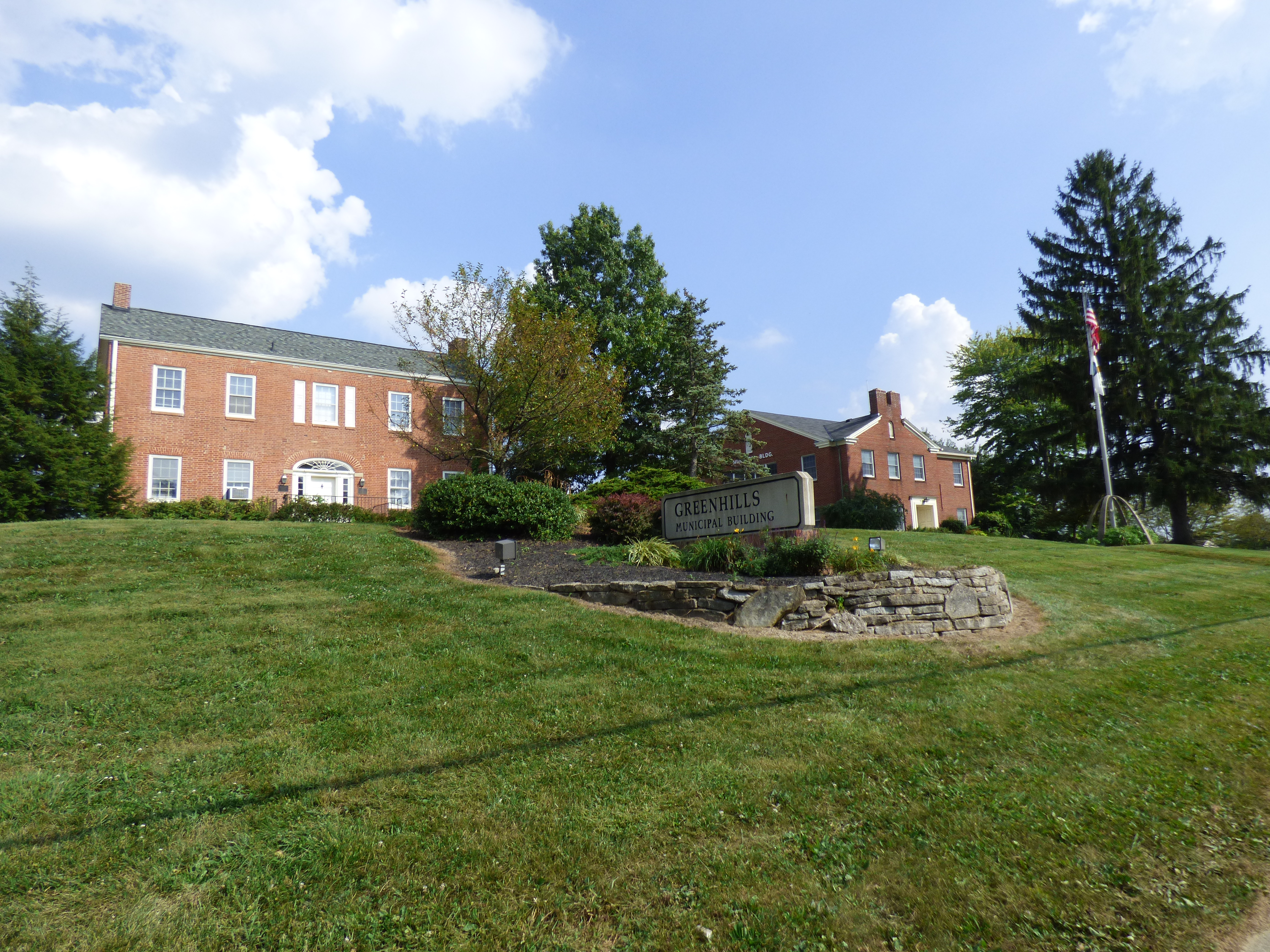
- Greenhills Ohio Municipal Building
- Motto: "Pioneering a Dream"
- Location in Hamilton County and the state of Ohio.
- Coordinates: 39°16′01″N 84°31′10″W
- Country: United States
- State: Ohio
- County: Hamilton

Government
  - Mayor: David Moore (R)

Area
  - Total: 1.24 sq mi (3.22 km^{2})
  - Land: 1.24 sq mi (3.22 km^{2})
  - Water: 0 sq mi (0.00 km^{2})
- Elevation: 801 ft (244 m)

Population (2020)
  - Total: 3,741
  - Estimate (2023): 3,656
  - Density: 3,006.7/sq mi (1,160.88/km^{2})
- Time zone: UTC-5 (Eastern (EST))
  - Summer (DST): UTC-4 (EDT)
- ZIP code: 45218
- Area code: 513
- FIPS code: 39-32158
- GNIS feature ID: 1086213
- Website: www.greenhillsohio.gov

Greenhills is a village in Hamilton County, Ohio, United States. The population was 3,741 at the 2020 census. A planned community, it was established by the United States government during the Great Depression. Most of the village is a National Historic Landmark for its history as a planned modernist community.

== History ==
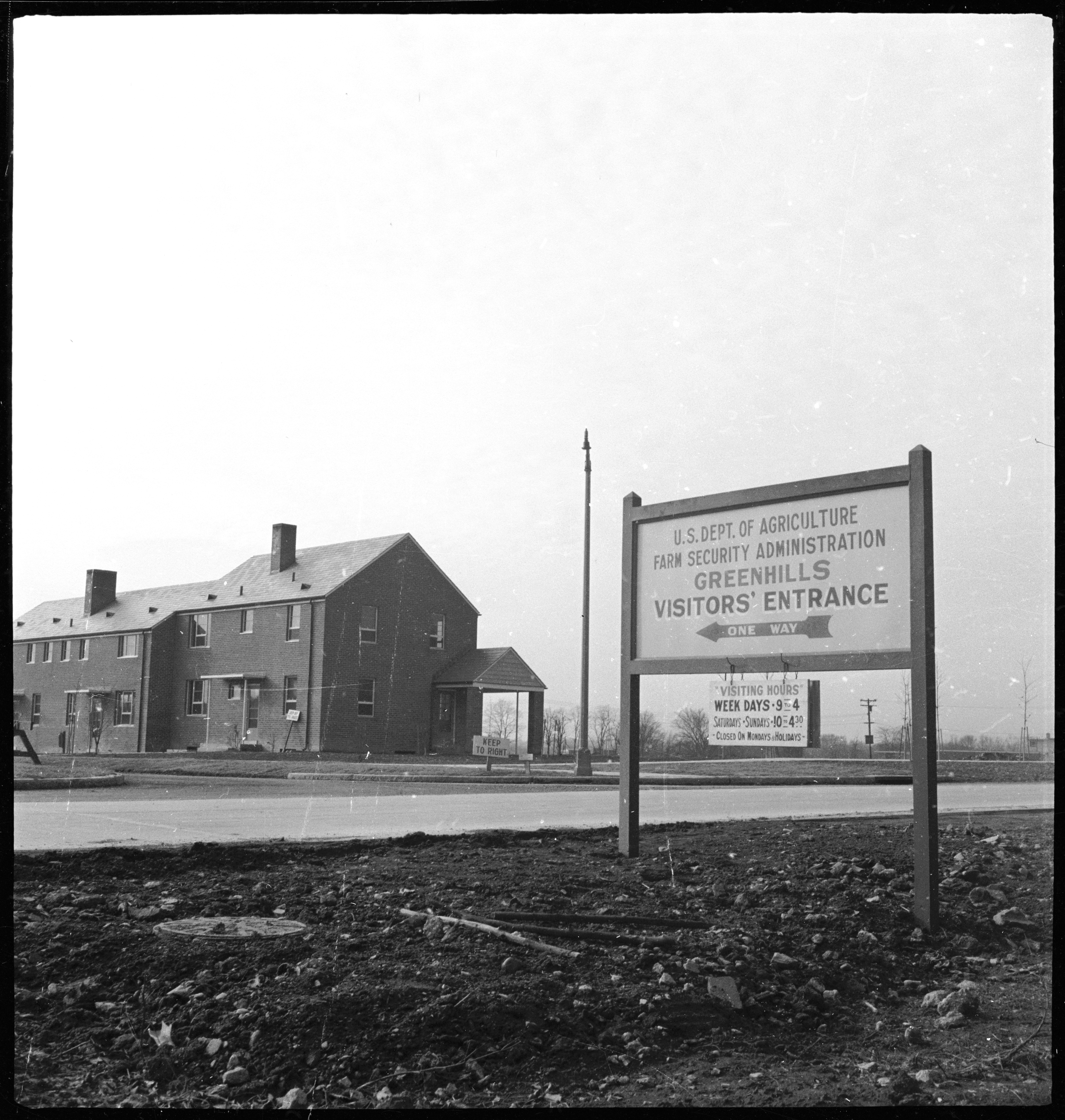
Greenhills in February 1938

As one of three Greenbelt Communities built by the Resettlement Administration during the 1930s (the other two are Greenbelt, Maryland and Greendale, Wisconsin), Greenhills was designed to be surrounded by a "belt" of woodland and natural landscaping. Like the other six "FDR towns", Greenhills was founded as a sundown town, using restrictive covenants to prevent minorities from purchasing homes there. Many families include third- and fourth-generation descendants of the village's original "pioneers" who occupied the original International-style townhomes. The original government-built area, the Greenhills Historic District, is listed on the National Register of Historic Places and is a National Historic Landmark. The community's James Whallon House, which serves as the village hall is also listed in the National Register of Historic Places. The landmarked area encompasses about three quarters of the area within the village bounds, excepting only the northeastern section northeast of Farragut and Ingram Roads.

== Geography ==
According to the United States Census Bureau, the village has a total area of 1.25 square miles (3.24 km^{2}), all land.

== Demographics ==
Historical population
Census	Pop.	Note	%±
1940	2,677		—
1950	3,005		12.3%
1960	5,407		79.9%
1970	6,092		12.7%
1980	4,927		−19.1%
1990	4,393		−10.8%
2000	4,103		−6.6%
2010	3,615		−11.9%
2020	3,741		3.5%
2023 (est.)	3,656	▼	−2.3%
U.S. Decennial Census

=== 2020 census ===
As of the 2020 census, Greenhills had a population of 3,741, with a population density of 3,007.23 people per square mile (1,160.88/km^{2}). The median age was 39.7 years. 22.1% of residents were under the age of 18 and 17.3% were 65 years of age or older. For every 100 females, there were 92.5 males, and for every 100 females age 18 and over, there were 88.2 males age 18 and over.

100.0% of residents lived in urban areas, while 0.0% lived in rural areas.

There were 1,537 households in Greenhills, of which 29.2% had children under the age of 18 living in them. Of all households, 42.9% were married-couple households, 18.4% were households with a male householder and no spouse or partner present, and 30.3% were households with a female householder and no spouse or partner present. About 30.6% of all households were made up of individuals, and 12.5% had someone living alone who was 65 years of age or older.

There were 1,618 housing units, of which 5.0% were vacant. The homeowner vacancy rate was 0.3% and the rental vacancy rate was 5.0%.

Racial composition as of the 2020 census
Race	Number	Percent
White	2,739	73.2%
Black or African American	561	15.0%
American Indian and Alaska Native	7	0.2%
Asian	34	0.9%
Native Hawaiian and Other Pacific Islander	0	0.0%
Some other race	83	2.2%
Two or more races	317	8.5%
Hispanic or Latino (of any race)	188	5.0%

=== Income and poverty ===
According to the U.S. Census American Community Survey, for the period 2016-2020, the estimated median annual income for a household in the village was $69,208, and the median income for a family was $80,625. About 10.7% of the population were living below the poverty line, including 14.5% of those under age 18 and 9.0% of those age 65 or over. About 62.0% of the population were employed, and 31.9% had a bachelor's degree or higher.

=== 2010 census ===
As of the census of 2010, there were 3,615 people, 1,499 households, and 968 families residing in the village. The population density was 2,892.0 inhabitants per square mile (1,116.6/km^{2}). There were 1,645 housing units at an average density of 1,316.0 per square mile (508.1/km^{2}). The racial makeup of the village was 88.0% White, 6.7% African American, 0.1% Native American, 0.8% Asian, 0.1% Pacific Islander, 0.7% from other races, and 3.6% from two or more races. Hispanic or Latino of any race were 2.4% of the population.

There were 1,499 households, of which 30.5% had children under the age of 18 living with them, 46.0% were married couples living together, 14.0% had a female householder with no husband present, 4.6% had a male householder with no wife present, and 35.4% were non-families. 30.3% of all households were made up of individuals, and 9.9% had someone living alone who was 65 years of age or older. The average household size was 2.37 and the average family size was 2.95.

The median age in the village was 39 years. 23.8% of residents were under the age of 18; 7.1% were between the ages of 18 and 24; 26.2% were from 25 to 44; 27% were from 45 to 64; and 16% were 65 years of age or older. The gender makeup of the village was 47.2% male and 52.8% female.

== Education ==
Greenhills is served by the Winton Woods City School District and a branch of the Public Library of Cincinnati and Hamilton County.

== See also ==
- List of National Historic Landmarks in Ohio
- List of sundown towns in the United States
