= Forest Park, Ohio =

- City
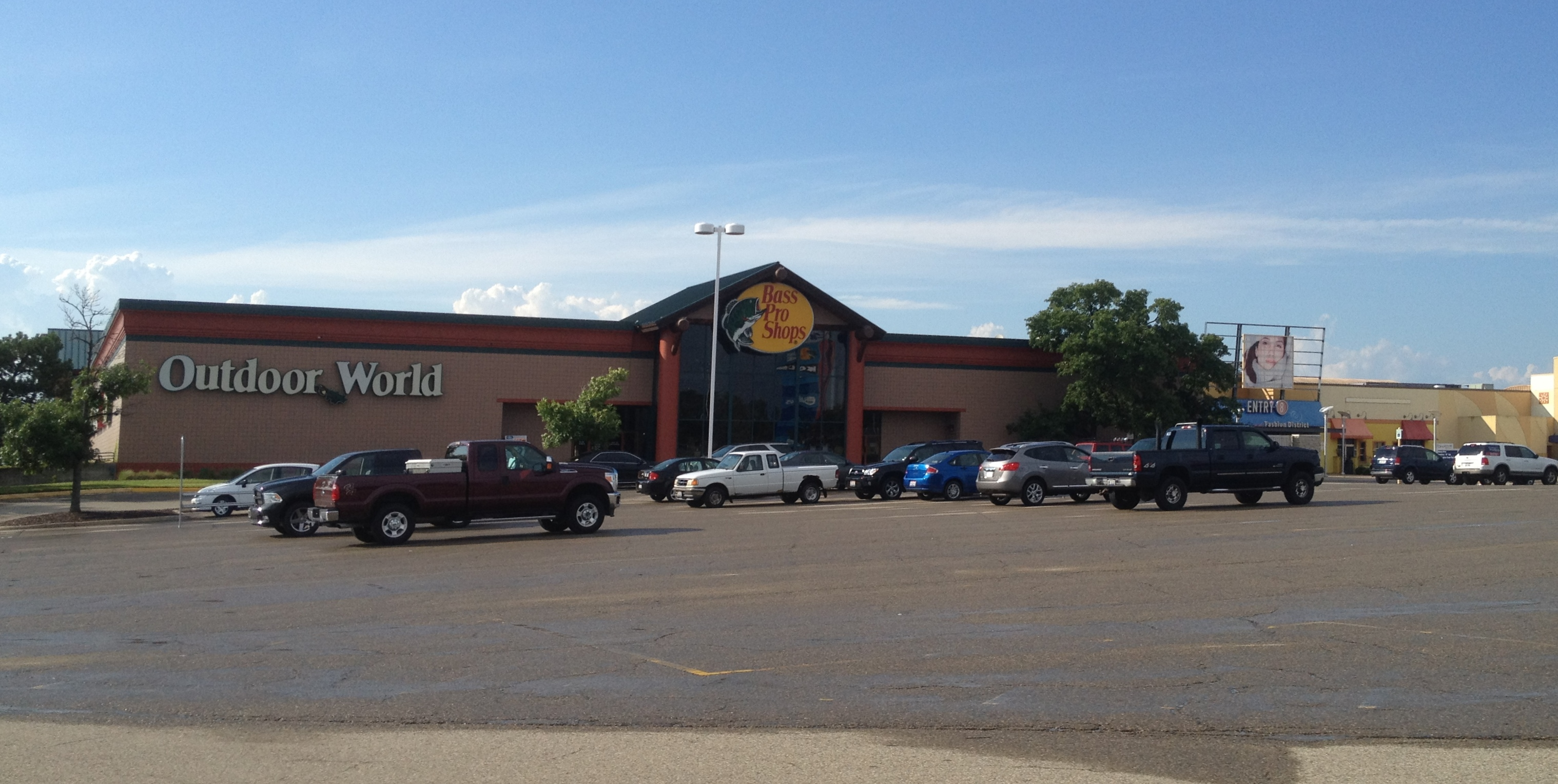
- Part of the Forest Fair Village shopping mall

- Flag Seal
- Motto: "Positioned For Progress"
- Interactive map of Forest Park, Ohio
- Location within Ohio Location within the United States
- Coordinates: 39°16′51″N 84°31′04″W
- Country: United States
- State: Ohio
- County: Hamilton

Government
  - Type: Council-Manager
  - Mayor: Aharon Brown (D)

Area
  - Total: 6.46 sq mi (16.72 km^{2})
  - Land: 6.45 sq mi (16.70 km^{2})
  - Water: 0.0039 sq mi (0.01 km^{2})
- Elevation: 879 ft (268 m)

Population (2020)
  - Total: 20,189
  - Estimate (2023): 19,839
  - Density: 3,131/sq mi (1,208.7/km^{2})
- Time zone: UTC-5 (Eastern (EST))
  - Summer (DST): UTC-4 (EDT)
- ZIP code: 45240
- Area code: 513
- FIPS code: 39-27706
- GNIS feature ID: 1086209
- Website: www.forestpark.org

Forest Park is a city in Hamilton County, Ohio, United States. It is a suburb of Cincinnati. The population was 20,189 at the 2020 census, making it the second-most populous city in Hamilton County.

== History ==
The City of Forest Park, Ohio was founded in 1956, two years after private developers Marvin Warner and Joseph Kanter purchased 3,400 acres of 5,930 acres north of Cincinnati originally set aside in 1935 by the Resettlement Administration under President Franklin D. Roosevelt to relocate struggling urban and rural families to one of three such communities planned by the government called Greenbelt towns.

The Greenbelt concept was abandoned in 1949 and the as yet undeveloped acreage of Greenhills, Ohio, which had opened in 1938, became available for purchase by the Warner-Kanter Corporation in 1954. After two years of planning they opened homes for purchase in the first residential area of Forest Park, the C section, in March 1956.

After growing to a population of 4800 in 1960 and incorporation as a village in 1961, then achieving city status in 1968, Forest Park intentionally became an “open city,” regularly adopting and passing resolutions and ordinances welcoming citizens regardless of race, creed or national origin, a policy intended to maintain the city's commitment to diversity.

Toward this end, in 1978, the Forest Park Housing Commission created “A Comprehensive Strategy for Maintaining Diversity in Forest Park, “to combat discriminatory practices by realtors, builders and corporations.”

After a 1980 lawsuit filed by the city against a builder was dismissed for insufficient evidence, the Forest Park council issued a statement declaring that “people have the right to choose where to live, work or play based on their own free choice. That right must be secured for all people and never be artificially restricted.”

The Quality of Integrated Life resolution of 1982 would serve as a guide to integrated living, reinforcing the long-held view that diversity was a strength of Forest Park as the city moved toward a new century. In 1991 this view was reinforced when a Quality of Life Task Force issued a vision statement reflecting the “shared values of a multicultural citizenry.”

== Geography ==
According to the United States Census Bureau, the city has a total area of 6.48 square miles (16.78 km^{2}), all land.

=== Borders ===
Forest Park borders the following:

Cities

- Fairfield
- Springdale

Villages

- Greenhills

Townships

- Springfield
- Colerain

Counties

- Butler

== Demographics ==
Historical population
Census	Pop.	Note	%±
1970	15,139		—
1980	18,770		24.0%
1990	18,609		−0.9%
2000	19,463		4.6%
2010	18,720		−3.8%
2020	20,189		7.8%
2025 (est.)	20,041		−0.7%
U.S. Decennial Census

=== Racial and ethnic composition ===
Forest Park city, Ohio – Racial and ethnic composition Note: the US Census treats Hispanic/Latino as an ethnic category. This table excludes Latinos from the racial categories and assigns them to a separate category. Hispanics/Latinos may be of any race.
Race / Ethnicity (NH = Non-Hispanic)	Pop 2000	Pop 2010	Pop 2020	% 2000	% 2010	% 2020
White alone (NH)	7,035	4,266	3,822	36.15%	22.79%	18.93%
Black or African American alone (NH)	10,911	12,088	11,250	56.06%	64.57%	55.72%
Native American or Alaska Native alone (NH)	21	40	22	0.11%	0.21%	0.11%
Asian alone (NH)	713	402	1,386	3.66%	2.15%	6.87%
Native Hawaiian or Pacific Islander alone (NH)	11	31	52	0.06%	0.17%	0.26%
Other Race alone (NH)	81	84	131	0.42%	0.45%	0.65%
Mixed race or Multiracial (NH)	402	605	875	2.07%	3.23%	4.33%
Hispanic or Latino (any race)	289	1,204	2,651	1.48%	6.43%	13.13%
Total	19,463	18,720	20,189	100.00%	100.00%	100.00%

=== 2020 census ===
As of the 2020 census, Forest Park had a population of 20,189 and a population density of 3,130.56 people per square mile (1,208.70/km^{2}).

As of the 2020 census, the median age was 35.8 years, 25.1% of residents were under the age of 18, 15.6% of residents were 65 years of age or older, there were 89.8 males for every 100 females, and there were 86.5 males for every 100 females age 18 and over.

As of the 2020 census, there were 7,512 households, of which 34.0% had children under the age of 18 living in them, 38.6% were married-couple households, 18.8% were households with a male householder and no spouse or partner present, 35.5% were households with a female householder and no spouse or partner present, about 28.0% were made up of individuals, and 10.4% had someone living alone who was 65 years of age or older.

As of the 2020 census, there were 7,856 housing units, of which 4.4% were vacant, the homeowner vacancy rate was 1.1%, and the rental vacancy rate was 4.9%.

As of the 2020 census, 100.0% of residents lived in urban areas and 0.0% lived in rural areas.

Racial composition as of the 2020 census
Race	Number	Percent
White	4,026	19.9%
Black or African American	11,319	56.1%
American Indian and Alaska Native	129	0.6%
Asian	1,387	6.9%
Native Hawaiian and Other Pacific Islander	55	0.3%
Some other race	1,756	8.7%
Two or more races	1,517	7.5%
Hispanic or Latino (of any race)	2,651	13.1%

=== American Community Survey (2016–2020) ===
According to the U.S. Census American Community Survey for 2016-2020, the estimated median annual income for a household in the city was $58,257, and the median income for a family was $73,259. About 8.4% of the population were living below the poverty line, including 9.3% of those under age 18 and 7.0% of those age 65 or over. About 65.9% of the population were employed, and 27.3% had a bachelor's degree or higher.

=== 2010 census ===
As of the census of 2010, there were 18,720 people, 7,212 households, and 4,924 families living in the city. The population density was 2,888.9 inhabitants per square mile (1,115.4/km^{2}). There were 7,854 housing units at an average density of 1,212.0 per square mile (468.0/km^{2}). The racial makeup of the city was 24.9% White, 65.0% African American, 0.2% Native American, 2.2% Asian, 0.2% Pacific Islander, 3.9% from other races, and 3.6% from two or more races. Hispanic or Latino of any race were 6.4% of the population.

There were 7,212 households, of which 35.8% had children under the age of 18 living with them, 40.8% were married couples living together, 21.9% had a female householder with no husband present, 5.5% had a male householder with no wife present, and 31.7% were non-families. 26.6% of all households were made up of individuals, and 7.3% had someone living alone who was 65 years of age or older. The average household size was 2.59 and the average family size was 3.13.

The median age in the city was 35.8 years. 26.9% of residents were under the age of 18; 9.1% were between the ages of 18 and 24; 26.2% were from 25 to 44; 26% were from 45 to 64; and 11.7% were 65 years of age or older. The gender makeup of the city was 46.4% male and 53.6% female.

=== 2000 census ===
As of the census of 2000, there were 19,463 people, 7,505 households, and 5,238 families living in the city. The population density was 2,990.4 inhabitants per square mile (1,154.6/km^{2}). There were 7,748 housing units at an average density of 1,190.4 per square mile (459.6/km^{2}). The racial makeup of the city was 36.70% White, 56.26% African American, 0.11% Native American, 3.67% Asian, 0.08% Pacific Islander, 0.99% from other races, and 2.20% from two or more races. Hispanic or Latino of any race were 1.48% of the population.

There were 7,505 households, out of which 34.0% had children under the age of 18 living with them, 50.4% were married couples living together, 15.6% had a female householder with no husband present, and 30.2% were non-families. 24.9% of all households were made up of individuals, and 5.3% had someone living alone who was 65 years of age or older. The average household size was 2.58 and the average family size was 3.12.

In the city the population was spread out, with 27.1% under the age of 18, 8.4% from 18 to 24, 31.9% from 25 to 44, 23.6% from 45 to 64, and 9.1% who were 65 years of age or older. The median age was 34 years. For every 100 females, there were 92.3 males. For every 100 females age 18 and over, there were 88.0 males.

The median income for a household in the city was $49,298, and the median income for a family was $55,618. Males had a median income of $38,682 versus $28,454 for females. The per capita income for the city was $21,820. About 5.1% of families and 6.0% of the population were below the poverty line, including 8.2% of those under age 18 and 7.3% of those age 65 or over.

== Education ==
The Winton Woods City School District covers most of Forest Park, along with Greenhills and Springfield Township.

Forest Park is served by a branch of the Public Library of Cincinnati and Hamilton County.
