= Springfield Township, Hamilton County, Ohio =

Township in Ohio, US

- Township
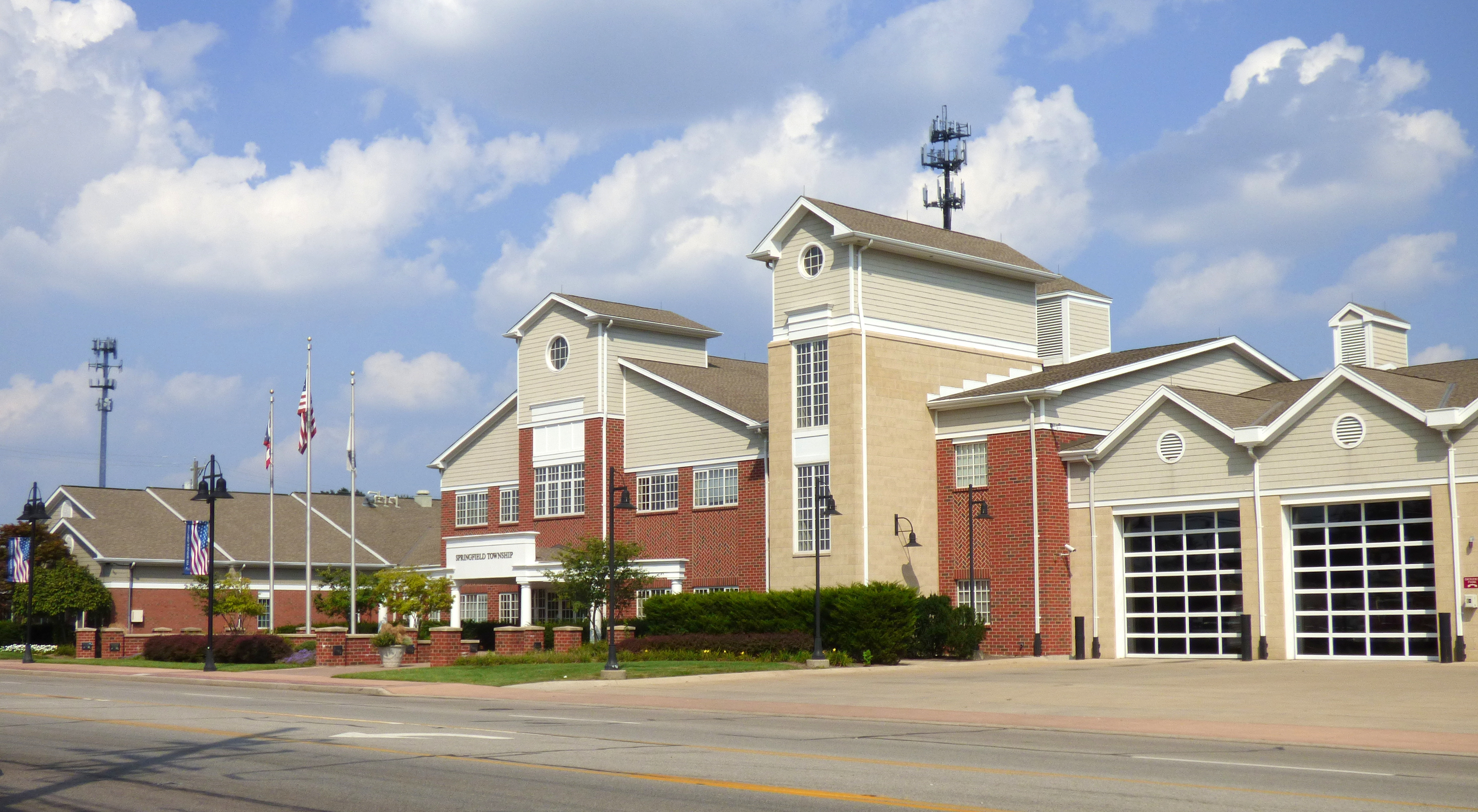
- Township government building

- Flag Logo

- Location in Hamilton County and the state of Ohio.
- Coordinates: 39°14′39″N 84°31′34″W
- Country: United States
- State: Ohio
- County: Hamilton
- Established: 1795

Area
  - Total: 16.6 sq mi (43.1 km^{2})
  - Land: 16.4 sq mi (42.4 km^{2})
  - Water: 0.27 sq mi (0.7 km^{2})
- Elevation: 715 ft (218 m)

Population (2020)
  - Total: 35,862
  - Density: 2,191/sq mi (845.8/km^{2})
- Time zone: UTC-5 (Eastern (EST))
  - Summer (DST): UTC-4 (EDT)
- Area code: 513
- FIPS code: 39-74121
- GNIS feature ID: 1086230
- Website: www.springfieldtwp.org

Springfield Township is one of the twelve townships of Hamilton County, Ohio, United States. The population was 35,862 as of the 2020 census. Springfield Township is home to the largest private school in Ohio (St. Xavier High School), the largest lake in Hamilton County (at Winton Woods County Park), and the Cincinnati area's annual Greek Festival (at Holy Trinity-St. Nicholas Greek Orthodox Church).

== History ==
In 1795, upon the signing of the Treaty of Greenville, the court of general quarter sessions of the peace for Hamilton County created Springfield and Fairfield townships out of the northern reaches of Cincinnati Township.

In 1810, Millcreek Township was formed from the northern part of Cincinnati Township and the southern part of Springfield Township.

=== Name ===
Springfield Township is one of 11 townships by this name statewide.

== Geography ==
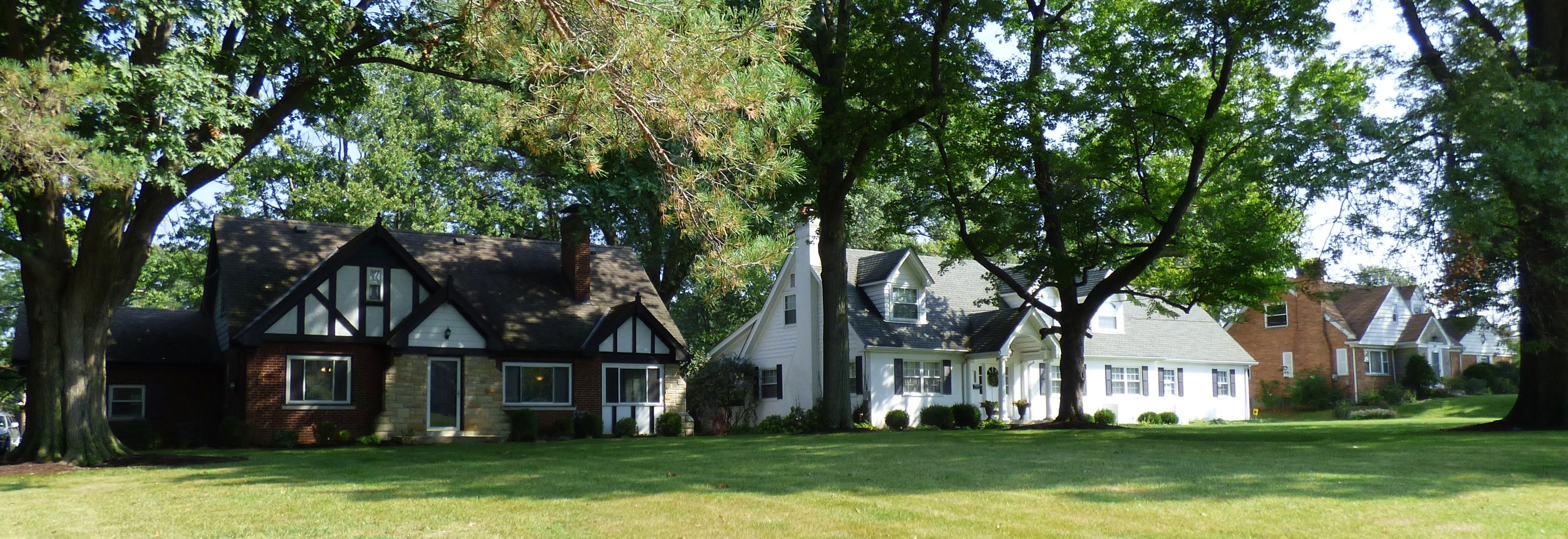
Residential housing in Finneytown

Springfield Township is suburban with abundant green space and parks, including most of the 2,500-acre Winton Woods County Park. The township also includes the largest lake in Hamilton County, the 188 surface-acre Winton Woods lake.

Springfield Township today consists of the core of the original township boundaries, although five non-contiguous "islands" exist due to annexations. The Township Master Plan divides the township into eleven neighborhoods, which closely align with the seven public school districts serving the township, but generally not the five census-designated places (CDPs).

Neighborhood	School district	Notes
Finneytown	Finneytown Local Schools	Also a CDP
Winton Northeast	Winton Woods Local Schools	
Winton Northwest	Winton Woods Local Schools	Contains part of Pleasant Hills CDP
Lexington Heights, Glencoe, and Wellsprings	Mount Healthy City Schools	Contains part of Pleasant Hills CDP
Hamilton Northeast	Mount Healthy City Schools	Contains part of New Burlington CDP
Hamilton Southwest	Mount Healthy City Schools	Contains part of New Burlington CDP and part of Skyline Acres CDP
Seven Hills	Mount Healthy City Schools	Part of New Burlington CDP
Hollydale	Princeton City Schools	
Pleasant Run Farm	Northwest Local Schools	The two northwest exclaves; the northern one is also a CDP
West College Hill	North College Hill City Schools	The southwest exclave
The Valley	Cincinnati Public Schools	The three southeast exclaves

The following municipalities have become independent of, or annexed land within, the original Springfield Township boundaries:

- Arlington Heights, in the southeast
- Cincinnati, in the south
- Fairfield, in the northwest
- Forest Park, in the north
- Glendale, in the northeast
- Greenhills, in the north
- Lincoln Heights, in the east
- Lockland, in the southeast
- Mount Healthy, in the southwest
- North College Hill, in the southwest
- Springdale, in the northeast
- Woodlawn, in the east
- Wyoming, in the southeast

The Township borders ten municipalities, and Colerain Township to the west:

- Fairfield - north, north of Forest Park
- Forest Park - north, between Fairfield and Green Hills, west of Springdale
- Greenhills - north, south of Forest Park
- Springdale - northeast, between Forest Park and Glendale
- Glendale - northeast, between Springdale and Woodlawn
- Woodlawn - east, between Glendale and Wyoming
- Wyoming - southeast, between Woodlawn and Cincinnati
- Cincinnati - south
- North College Hill - southwest, south of Mount Healthy
- Mount Healthy - southwest, north of North College Hill
- Colerain Township - west

== Demographics ==
Historical population
Census	Pop.	Note	%±
1820	2,197		—
1850	3,633		—
1860	5,538		52.4%
1870	6,548		18.2%
1880	7,975		21.8%
1890	10,793		35.3%
1900	11,937		10.6%
1910	14,797		24.0%
1920	14,174		−4.2%
1930	25,460		79.6%
1940	29,636		16.4%
1950	41,187		39.0%
1960	77,420		88.0%
1970	49,057		−36.6%
1980	42,024		−14.3%
1990	38,509		−8.4%
2000	37,587		−2.4%
2010	36,319		−3.4%
2020	35,862		−1.3%

=== 2020 census ===
As of the census of 2020, there were 35,862 people living in the township, for a population density of 2,186.7 people per square mile (845.8/km^{2}). There were 14,777 housing units. The racial makeup of the township was 47.0% White, 41.8% Black or African American, 0.3% Native American, 3.0% Asian, 0.1% Pacific Islander, 2.3% from some other race, and 5.6% from two or more races. 3.9% of the population were Hispanic or Latino of any race.

There were 14,585 households, out of which 28.1% had children under the age of 18 living with them, 46.6% were married couples living together, 15.2% had a male householder with no spouse present, and 33.8% had a female householder with no spouse present. 30.0% of all households were made up of individuals, and 11.8% were someone living alone who was 65 years of age or older. The average household size was 2.41, and the average family size was 3.00.

21.8% of the township's population were under the age of 18, 58.1% were 18 to 64, and 20.1% were 65 years of age or older. The median age was 45.3. For every 100 females, there were 91.5 males.

According to the U.S. Census American Community Survey, for the period 2016-2020 the estimated median annual income for a household in the township was $67,249, and the median income for a family was $79,112. About 11.4% of the population were living below the poverty line, including 24.5% of those under age 18 and 5.8% of those age 65 or over. About 59.8% of the population were employed, and 32.2% had a bachelor's degree or higher.

== Government ==
The township is governed by a three-member Board of Trustees, who are elected in November of odd-numbered years to a four-year term beginning on the following January 1. Two are elected in the year after the presidential election and one is elected in the year before it, alongside an elected township Fiscal Officer, who serves a four-year term beginning on April 1 of the year after the election. Vacancies in the Fiscal Office or on the Board of Trustees are filled by the remaining trustees.

The current Trustees are Kristie Dukes Davis, Joseph Honerlaw, and Mark Berning. Dan Berning is the Fiscal Officer.

== Education ==
Public elementary and secondary education is provided by seven school districts:

- Cincinnati Public Schools
- Finneytown Local
- Mount Healthy City
- North College Hill City
- Northwest Local
- Princeton City
- Winton Woods City

Only Finneytown school boundaries are solely within the boundaries of Springfield Township.

Private schools within the boundaries of Springfield Township include:

- Central Baptist Academy (K - 8)
- John Paul II (Catholic, K - 8)
- St. Vivian School (Catholic, PreK - 8)
- St. Xavier High School (Catholic, all-male, Grades 9–12)

St. Xavier is the largest private school in Ohio.
