= Givhan v. Western Line Consolidated School District =

1979 U.S. Supreme Court case about free speech rights of public employees

Givhan v. Western Line Consol. Sch. Dist.
- Supreme Court of the United States

Argued November 7, 1978 Decided January 9, 1979
- Full case name: Bessie Givhan v. Western Line Consolidated School District et al
- Docket no.: 77-1051
- Citations: 439 U.S. 410 (more) 99 S. Ct. 693; 58 L. Ed. 2d 619
- Argument: Oral argument
- Opinion announcement: Opinion announcement

Case history
- Prior: N.D.Miss. rev'd sub nom Ayers et al v. Western Line Consol. Sch. Dist, 555 F.2d 1309 (5th Cir., 1977).
- Subsequent: Verdict for plaintiff, unreported

Holding
- Teacher's private complaints to principal regarding racially disparate impact of school district policy, however intemperately expressed, were protected speech on a matter of public concern for which she could not be terminated by her public employer. Fifth Circuit reversed and remanded.

Court membership
- Chief Justice Warren E. Burger Associate Justices William J. Brennan Jr. · Potter Stewart; Byron White · Thurgood Marshall; Harry Blackmun · Lewis F. Powell Jr. William Rehnquist · John P. Stevens

Case opinions
- Majority: Rehnquist, joined by unanimous
- Concurrence: Stevens

Laws applied
- U.S. Const. Amds. I, XIV

Givhan v. Western Line Consolidated School District, 439 U.S. 410 (1979), is a United States Supreme Court decision on the free speech rights of public employees. The Court held unanimously in favor of a schoolteacher fired for her critical remarks in conversations with her principal. Justice William Rehnquist wrote the opinion, with a short concurrence by John Paul Stevens.

The petitioner, Bessie Givhan, had believed that various policies and practices of the newly integrated Western Line School District in Mississippi were meant to sustain school segregation. In private meetings with her new principal, she persistently complained about this. The principal in turn recommended the district not rehire her, citing those conversations as well as some other issues. She joined the ongoing desegregation lawsuit as an intervenor, alleging that her First and Fourteenth Amendment rights to free speech and due process had been violated. The district court hearing the case agreed, but then the Fifth Circuit reversed that decision, holding that since she had not spoken publicly she was not entitled to constitutional protection, distinguishing her case from two other recent decisions in which the Supreme Court had ruled in favor of non-tenured teachers let go by their districts following critical statements by noting that in those cases, the criticism had been expressed in a public context.

Rehnquist's opinion rejected that distinction, calling the Fifth Circuit's reading too narrow. He further rejected its claim that Givhan had forced herself on an unwilling listener, since the principal had invited her in. Since the district had cited other, potentially permissible reasons for its action, the Court remanded the case to the district court to apply the Mt. Healthy test, from one of the other two cases involving teachers, and determine if the district had adequate reason to fire her other than the speech. Three years later, the lower court found that it did not, and ordered Givhan reinstated after a 12-year absence.

The Court has not had to significantly revisit the holding since then, and it has not been subject to much commentary or legal analysis. Four years later, in Connick v. Myers, its next case on the free speech rights of public employees, it began to limit Givhan and its predecessors by sketching out a test for whether the employee's speech was on a matter of public concern. In the early 21st century, its holding in Garcetti v. Ceballos, that speech made by employees pursuant to their job duties was not protected, appeared to some to complicate Givhan although the Court said it would not.

== Underlying dispute ==
An African American, Bessie Givhan began teaching junior high school-level English at the all-black Norma O'Bannon School in Greenville, Mississippi, in 1963. As with other school districts in the South in the wake of the Supreme Court's 1955 Brown v. Board of Education decision, a lawsuit had been brought to desegregate schools in the state. In the middle of 1970, the schools in the Greenville area were formally integrated per the Supreme Court's order in Alexander v. Holmes County Board of Education that Southern schools desegregate immediately. She was reassigned to Riverside High School in Avon, 30 miles (48 km) away.

At the beginning of the 1971 school year she was transferred again, to Glen Allan High School, near Avon. Years later she described Glen Allan as a "stepchild" within the newly created Western Line Consolidated School District. With a larger proportion of black students and faculty than the other two high schools in the new district, it was short of fundamental resources compared to them. "You could not compare [them]", she recalled in 2006.

She complained frequently to the principal, a white former teacher named James Leach. "I requested a pointer for my blackboard and an eraser, things of this sort that I needed as a teacher," she said. This did not endear her to Leach or the district administration. "I was labeled 'hostile' and 'unreasonable.'" At the end of the year she was informed that her contract would not be renewed. Leach told the superintendent that although she was "a competent teacher" she often had "an insulting and hostile attitude" and made "petty and unreasonable demands." She insisted that she be told why, and in a letter to her the district cited her refusal to administer standardized tests, her refusal to cooperate with the administration and an "antagonistic and hostile attitude ... throughout the school year."

== In lower courts ==
Givhan's case was heard first in federal district court, as part of the larger desegregation action against the school district. After it ruled in her favor, the school district appealed and won a partial reversal.

=== District court ===
Givhan joined the ongoing lawsuit in federal court for the Northern District of Mississippi over the integration of the school districts within its jurisdiction as an intervenor. She alleged that her dismissal violated not only the terms of that case, which required that the district develop nonracial objective criteria for the retention of teachers and staff, something which it had failed to do, but her own rights to free speech and due process under the First and Fourteenth amendments.

During the two-day bench trial, the district offered other reasons that it claimed justified her dismissal, not all of them speech-related, in addition to the standardized tests she did not administer (at the time, Givhan had argued that students had insufficient time to prepare for them). She had supposedly walked out of a meeting on the desegregation plan along with other teachers in 1969 and blown their car horns in an effort to disrupt the meeting; and in 1970 she and other teachers had threatened not to come to work after the midyear integration. Lastly, they said, she had helped a student conceal a knife he was in possession of during a search while at Riverside.

Givhan admitted this last incident, but the district court found it to be unrelated to her dismissal as the superintendent did not seem to have considered it when deciding whether to retain it or not. The evidence on the other three allegations was inconclusive. The court found in her favor and ordered her reinstatement.

Not only had her demands not been "constant" as the district claimed, the judge wrote "[t]he school district's motivation in failing to renew Givhan's contract was almost entirely a desire to rid themselves of a vocal critic of the district's policies and practices which were capable of interpretation as embodying racial discrimination." And under the Supreme Court's decision in Pickering v. Board of Education, in which it had ruled in favor of an Illinois teacher fired for writing a letter to the editor of a local newspaper critical of the school board, Givhan's complaints to Leach were protected by the First Amendment as speech on a matter of public concern.

The district appealed to the Fifth Circuit. Givhan's case was heard along with several other teachers challenging their dismissals in the absence of the criteria that were supposed to have been developed to govern them. Judges Walter Pettus Gewin, Paul Hitch Roney and James Clinkscales Hill were empaneled to hear their cases.

=== Appeals court ===
In 1977, six years after Givhan's dismissal, the court reached its decision. Gewin wrote for a majority that first considered, per the Supreme Court's holding earlier that year in Mt. Healthy City School District Board of Education v. Doyle, an Ohio case also involving a nontenured high school teacher fired over critical speech, It required that the court consider whether, if there were other reasons for the adverse personnel action that did not violate the plaintiff's constitutional rights, they would have been enough to justify it.

Gewin was skeptical. "Appellants seem to argue that the preponderance of the evidence shows that the same decision would have been justified, but that is not the same as proving that the same decision would have been made," he wrote. The alleged incidents did not seem from the record to have been much of a factor in the district's decision at the time Givhan was let go. "Therefore appellants failed to make a successful 'same decision anyway' defense"

However, the crucial question for Givhan was not that, it was whether her discussions with Leach enjoyed First Amendment protection. And on that score, Gewin began, "[n]ot all expression by a government employee is constitutionally protected." Pickering had held that the employee's constitutional interest had to be balanced against the government's interest in running the school system in an efficient and orderly manner. The court, he continued, had not found any of the cases in the party's briefs helpful in deciding whether it was, so it turned to "general free speech principles."

In Pickering, Mt. Healthy and Perry v. Sindermann, the "trilogy" of cases brought by educators alleging unconstitutional retaliatory firings that served as precedent for Givhan, Gewin observed, the crucial factor had been that the plaintiffs' speech was public: Pickering had written a letter to the editor, Doyle had shared a memo with a local radio station that then reported its contents as news, and Sindermann had been a public critic of the state college's governing board. He found another recent case of a public employee's speech rights, Madison School District v. Wisconsin Employment Relations Commission, followed this pattern. There, the Court had held that the right of a nonunion teacher to speak at a public meeting prevailed over a provision of state labor law that forbade negotiations with anyone not in the bargaining unit. Other prominent recent free-speech cases, Gewin also found, emphasized the public context of the speech entitled to protection.

Further, Gewin wrote, two other recent cases established that the First Amendment did not give speakers the right to compel that their speech be heard. Rowan v. U.S. Post Office Dept. had upheld a postal regulation allowing customers to refuse to receive potentially obscene advertising or advertising for such products or periodicals. Lehman v. Shaker Heights had held that a public transit system had no obligation to carry political advertisements. Based on these two precedents, Gewin wrote:

These general principles lead us to conclude that teacher Givhan did not engage in constitutionally protected speech in her expressions to principal Leach. Neither a teacher nor a citizen has a constitutional right to single out a public employee to serve as the audience for his or her privately expressed views, at least in the absence of evidence that the public employee was given that task by law, custom, or school Board decision. There is no evidence here that Givhan sought to disseminate her views publicly, to anyone willing to listen. Rather, she brought her complaints to Leach alone. Neither is there evidence that the Board or Mississippi law delegated to Leach the task of entertaining complaints from all comers and that he discriminated in choosing to reject her complaints and not to rehire her because she impressed him into such service.

To explain further, Gewin invoked the legal saying that hard cases make bad law. While he agreed that the substance of Givhan's complaints to Leach might well have been seen as "laudable" by some observers, "[p]rotection of the First Amendment, however, does not turn on the social worth of ideas. If we held Givhan's expressions constitutionally protected, we would in effect force school principals to be ombudsmen, for damnable as well as laudable expressions." While such a policy might not be such a bad idea, he continued, it would be better being adopted by the school board or legislature, rather than being imposed by a court.

Since the court had found against Givhan on her constitutional claims, it reversed the Northern District. However, the district court had not reached a verdict on her claims that the ongoing desegregation suit had been violated by her dismissal, so the case was remanded for further proceedings to decide that issue.

== Supreme Court ==
Instead of returning to district court, Givhan petitioned the Supreme Court for certiorari. It was granted, and the Court heard oral arguments in November 1978. Givhan herself, who was working at a community counseling organization as she could not find another teaching job due to the ongoing litigation, flew to Washington to watch those proceedings in person.

The Court announced its decision two months later, at the beginning of 1979. All nine justices had sided with Givhan, holding that her conversations with Leach were indeed, per Pickering, protected speech on a matter of public concern. Justice William Rehnquist wrote the opinion.

=== Opinion of the Court ===
Rehnquist responded harshly to the Fifth Circuit's opinion. After quoting its concern that ruling for Givhan would force principals to be "ombudsmen", he said that the justices were "unable to agree that private expression of one's views is beyond constitutional protection, and therefore reverse the Court of Appeals' judgment and remand the case so that it may consider the contentions of the parties freed from this erroneous view of the First Amendment."

Gewin had further erred in distinguishing Givhan's case from the Pickering–Perry–Mt. Healthy trilogy by the fact that those three had involved public expression rather than private discussions. Rehnquist looked to the text of the amendment itself in response:

The First Amendment forbids abridgment of the "freedom of speech." Neither the Amendment itself nor our decisions indicate that this freedom is lost to the public employee who arranges to communicate privately with his employer rather than to spread his views before the public. We decline to adopt such a view of the First Amendment.

While he speculated that, based on its citation to another one of its cases, the Fifth Circuit had also seen the fact that Givhan was speaking to her principal rather than the school board as significant in assessing its disruptive effect on district operations, as per Pickering, Rehnquist did not see a difference there, either. (Note: In a footnote to this section of the opinion, Rehnquist conceded that while in a public context only the content of the speech matters for that side of the Pickering balancing test, "[p]rivate expression, however, may in some situations bring additional factors to the Pickering calculus. When a government employee personally confronts his immediate superior, the employing agency's institutional efficiency may be threatened not only by the content of the employee's message but also by the manner, time, and place in which it is delivered." (Givhan, 415n4))

The facts of the case dispensed with the Fifth Circuit's other grounds for excluding Givhan's speech from constitutional protection. "Nor is the Court of Appeals' view supported by the 'captive audience' rationale. Having opened his office door to petitioner, the principal was hardly in a position to argue that he was the "unwilling recipient" of her views."

Since Mt. Healthy had not been decided when the district court had tried the case, the burden-shifting mandated by that decision was not yet part of the process. Therefore, Rehnquist noted, the school district had not been allowed to prove that Givhan's other alleged misconduct was sufficient to fire her if the protected conversations could not be considered. (Note: He allowed in a footnote that, unlike the Fifth Circuit, the justices believed that that cause existed if some of the documented incidents had actually occurred. (Givhan, 417n5)) The Court thus instructed that it be considered on remand to the trial court. Justice John Paul Stevens added a short concurrence clarifying that the district court could make that finding on the basis of the existing record, without retrying the case, if it so chose.

== Subsequent proceedings ==
Later that year, the district court applied the Mt. Healthy test and again held for Givhan. It stated that the school district's other reasons for the firing were just rationalizations it found afterwards and ordered not only that she be reinstated but given full back pay and attorney's fees. The school district appealed again to the Fifth Circuit, but in 1982 it upheld the district court's decision.

== Aftermath and legacy ==
Although she had not taught for the 12 years it had taken her to win her case, Givhan decided to return. "It was really a big decision," she said in 2006. "It was like the show, Deal or No Deal. It was a tough call." Ultimately she decided to do so for the other teachers in the district. "For them, I went on back to see if I could make positive change."

She taught for another five years, then retired. Several years later she was ordained a Methodist minister, a position she has also since retired from. In her 2006 interview, she said it still "blows my mind in a positive way" that she won at the Supreme Court. "It gave me more faith in the justice system ... I believe justice can be done. It can prevail if it gets into the right hands."

== Subsequent jurisprudence ==
There have not been many cases that have dealt further with the issues raised by Givhan. The Supreme Court has heard two other cases that turned on speech on a matter of public concern by a public employee within the workplace, and there have been some cases in the appeals court cases that have relied in some measure on Givhan or discussed it at length.

=== Supreme Court ===
The Court's two most important post-Givhan cases where a public employee spoke privately resulted in rulings for the employers and narrowed the circumstances under which employees can make a First Amendment claim. Both however distinguished themselves from Givhan, emphasizing that the speech in that case was still protected.

==== Connick v. Myers ====
Four years after Givhan, the Court considered another case where a public employee sought damages for her dismissal over a private speech act on a matter of public concern. In Connick v. Myers the respondent, Sheila Myers, a former prosecutor working for Harry Connick Sr., Orleans Parish district attorney at that time, had distributed a questionnaire to her fellow employees in the wake of accepting a transfer she had had mixed feelings about. Among other things, it asked if they still had confidence in Connick and his top subordinates, and if they had ever been pressured to work on his political campaigns. When Connick, who was not in the office the day Myers distributed it, found out, she was fired. Both the district court and (again) the Fifth Circuit had ruled for her.

The Supreme Court reversed. Byron White, writing for a five-justice majority, distinguished Myers' conduct from Givhan's first by noting that much of her questionnaire did not touch on what the Court considered to matters of public concern. He also invoked the footnote to Givhan allowing contextual factors to be considered, rather than just the content of the speech, when the speech was private. "Here the questionnaire was prepared and distributed at the office; the manner of distribution required not only Myers to leave her work but others to do the same in order that the questionnaire be completed," White wrote. It was additionally distinctive that Myers had distributed the questionnaire immediately following her decision to accept the transfer. Givhan's speech with Leach, he further noted, had addressed racial issues in the school district, "a matter inherently of public concern."

In dissent, William Brennan faulted the majority for conditioning its finding that the questionnaire did not address a matter of public concern in part on it having been distributed privately. "[W]hether a particular statement by a public employee is addressed to a subject of public concern does not depend on where it was said or why," he wrote. "This conclusion is implicit in Givhan's holding."

==== Garcetti v. Ceballos ====
It would be more than 20 years before the Court again took a case turning on the private speech of public employees. In Garcetti v. Ceballos the respondent, another prosecutor in a large city, challenged as unconstitutional an adverse employment action by his superior, Los Angeles County District Attorney Gil Garcetti. He had recommended a case be dismissed after he had come to believe a deputy sheriff had made misrepresentations on a search warrant affidavit, which caused some friction between the district attorney's office and the sheriff's office and ultimately testified on the defense's behalf in an attempt to suppress the evidence obtained through the warrant. In response, he claimed, he was denied an expected promotion, demoted, and transferred to an outlying office.

Like Myers and Givhan, he filed suit. Unlike them, he lost at trial. On appeal, the Ninth Circuit reversed, saying that the D.A.'s office had failed the Pickering balancing test by not presenting any evidence that Ceballos's actions disrupted its efficient functioning. Circuit precedent also held that speech made as part of an employee's job was protected as well. However, Judge Diarmuid O'Scannlain wrote a special concurrence arguing that while precedent compelled the holding it should be revisited and overruled, since he did not see public employees as having any protectable personal interest in speech made as part of their job duties.

The Supreme Court reversed, in a 5–4 decision that greatly revised this area of the law. Writing for the majority, Justice Anthony Kennedy agreed that while Givhan still protected private speech to a superior such as had occurred in that case, other intervening precedent such as Rosenberger v. University of Virginia and Rust v. Sullivan had established that the government enjoyed great control over speech it paid for, such as the memo Ceballos had been required to write in any event.

That was the difference. Kennedy distinguished Ceballos from Givhan and the other plaintiffs who had come before her by noting that while they had spoken as citizens, he was just doing his job: "The controlling factor in Ceballos' case is that his expressions were made pursuant to his duties ... We hold that when public employees make statements pursuant to their official duties, the employees are not speaking as citizens for First Amendment purposes, and the Constitution does not insulate their communications from employer discipline."

Two of the three dissents mentioned Givhan, failing to see any distinction. "We had no difficulty recognizing that the First Amendment applied when Bessie Givhan, an English teacher, raised concerns about the school's racist employment practices to the principal," noted John Paul Stevens. "Our silence as to whether or not her speech was made pursuant to her job duties demonstrates that the point was immaterial."

David Souter put Givhan in the context of the entire Pickering line. "In each case, the Court realized that a public employee can wear a citizen's hat when speaking on subjects closely tied to the employee's own job, and Givhan stands for the same conclusion even when the speech is not addressed to the public at large, " he wrote.

The difference between a case like Givhan and this one is that the subject of Ceballos's speech fell within the scope of his job responsibilities, whereas choosing personnel was not what the teacher was hired to do. The effect of the majority's constitutional line between these two cases, then, is that a Givhan schoolteacher is protected when complaining to the principal about hiring policy, but a school personnel officer would not be if he protested that the principal disapproved of hiring minority job applicants. This is an odd place to draw a distinction, and while necessary judicial line-drawing sometimes looks arbitrary, any distinction obliges a court to justify its choice. Here, there is no adequate justification ...

=== Lower courts ===
Within a year of the decision appeals courts were viewing Givhan primarily as a clarification of the standard of proof required under the Mt. Healthy test. "Under Givhan, the initial burden is upon plaintiffs to show that their conduct was constitutionally protected," the First Circuit wrote in Rosaly v. Ignacio. "Plaintiffs must next establish that this conduct was a 'substantial factor' or a 'motivating factor' in [the adverse action] ... If the plaintiffs are to recover, the court (or jury) must expressly find that plaintiffs would not have been discharged 'but for' the constitutionally immunized activity"

In the course of endorsing this view the following year, the Seventh Circuit noted that in one case the Second Circuit had chosen to stick with the balancing test from Pickering rather than the "but-for" test from Givhan. In that case, Janusaitis v. Middlebury Volunteer Fire Dept., it considered the appeal of a Connecticut volunteer firefighter who alleged that he was dismissed in retaliation for his efforts to correct what he saw as financial improprieties in the department's operations, some of which involved letters he had prepared to be sent to regulatory agencies as well as his being the subject of a local newspaper article. The district court had found only the newspaper article to be constitutionally protected activity, and found that the plaintiff's generally abrasive and antisocial conduct justified his dismissal on Mt. Healthy grounds.

The panel reversed the district court on that issue, holding that all Janusaitis's other activities, such as the letters, came under First Amendment protection. "Hence, we cannot rely on the doctrine of Mt. Healthy in this case," wrote Judge Murray Irwin Gurfein. Therefore, the court returned to Pickering's test: did Janusaitis's activities disrupt the orderly functioning of what the court had already held to be a public agency? (Note: Although the fire department was a privately run organization, the court had held that it was a governmental agency for this case since it performed a key governmental function (fire protection and suppression) under an agreement with the town as specifically authorized by state statute for that purpose.)

While it had rejected Givhan's but-for test, the court found Rehnquist's fourth footnote particularly dispositive, due to both its factual findings and the unique nature of the work the government agency performed.

In applying these guidelines we distinguish between the rights of a school teacher who expresses views essentially as a citizen and for whom the target is the institution or proposition rather than the person or where the person attacked is far removed from the situation. When lives may be at stake in a fire, an esprit de corps is essential to the success of the joint endeavor. Carping criticism and abrasive conduct have no place in a small organization that depends upon common loyalty — "harmony among coworkers"... In this state of affairs it would be folly to presume that the functioning of the voluntary fire department would not be seriously impaired if appellant were reinstated by an order of a court. The baleful glance, the hostile look, and the positive distaste for the trouble-maker on the part of his fellow volunteers, coupled with the lingering resentment on the part of appellant himself at not being given the authority he sought, would hardly invoke the comradeship that makes a fire-fighting unit successful.

After Garcetti, plaintiffs have sought protection by comparing their speech to Givhan's rather than Ceballos's. A Lake Pontchartrain Causeway police officer fired for his mishandling of an incident where Eddie Price III, mayor of nearby Mandeville, drunkenly crashed a city-owned vehicle through a closed tollbooth, claimed the action was in part for his threat during the investigation to reveal evidence of widespread police misconduct. When he filed suit in the Eastern District of Louisiana, he argued that his speech was, like Givhan's, made to his superior and thus was not to be considered part of his job duties. Judge Sarah S. Vance disagreed, distinguishing his speech from Givhan's by noting hers had not been made during an investigation into her conduct and thus her job had not been at stake.

In a 2012 order, a magistrate judge of the Western District of Arkansas also used Givhan as a standard to compare the plaintiff with. In Greer v. City of Warren, a police officer alleged his dismissal for allegedly using a racial slur during an arrest and displaying the Confederate flag at his home and on his MySpace page was itself a retaliatory act for his report of a racial slur used by another officer. Since Givhan's speech to her principal on the racial issues at the school had been called "inherently a matter of public concern" in Connick's footnote 8, the magistrate found the plaintiff's report to his superior was also protected speech.

==== Weintraub v. Board of Education of New York City School District ====
Whether to apply Garcetti or Givhan split a court in 2010. In Weintraub v. Board of Education of New York City School District, the Second Circuit considered the appeal of a teacher at a Brooklyn elementary school who claimed he was retaliated against and fired after he filed a grievance with the teachers' union when the school's principal refused to discipline a student who had thrown a book at him. After the Eastern District of New York held that neither his conversation with the principal nor the grievance were protected speech under Garcetti, he filed an interlocutory appeal. While other circuits had ruled on the latter question, the Second never had.

In the majority opinion, Judge John M. Walker, Jr. distinguished Weintraub's speech to his principal from Givhan's to Leach's by noting that hers was not related to her core duties as an English teacher, whereas his was since it concerned classroom discipline. Further, he continued the speech in the form of a grievance, for which "there is no relevant citizen analogue ... [It is] an internal communication made pursuant to an existing dispute-resolution policy established by his employer."

Guido Calabresi, former dean of Yale Law School, dissented. He felt the majority had read Garcetti too expansively, particularly in the educational context, since so many factors could relate to a teacher's core duties of "effective teaching and classroom learning," as they had described them. "Would Givhan come out the same way under the majority's framework? Givhan's speech concerned her students' opinions on the school's handling of racial issues, a matter that has serious pedagogical implications." In a footnote, he further criticized how the majority had construed the union, via the grievance process, as an extension of the employer. "As a general matter, I doubt that most employers would view union activity as something that their employees do for the employer's benefit. There is a distinct irony in the idea that unions, which so many employers seek to exclude from the workplace, are somehow transmuted into entities that "promote the employer's mission," for purposes of the First Amendment." (Note: The next year, in Borough of Duryea v. Guarnieri (564 U.S. ___, 2011), the Court held that the Petition Clause of the First Amendment only protects a labor grievance if its substance is a matter of public concern.)

== Analysis and commentary ==
Writing in the Western New England Law Review a year after the decision, John Koltes III considered it a generally positive development. "[It] clarified the weight to be accorded the factors set forth in Pickering and established Doyle as the test to be used when employees assert that their dismissal or transfer was unconstitutionally motivated." Nevertheless, he was concerned by how lower courts had been interpreting footnote 4 to consider the time, place and manner of an employee's public speech, when evaluating the constitutionality of the adverse action, citing Janusaitis and another Texas case involving a fired teacher's aide. "This expanded reading ... works to the detriment of public employees' First Amendment rights."

In another contemporary comment, William & Mary law professor Frederick Schauer considered the effect of the decision in extending First Amendment protection to speech made in a private context. "It has much to commend it," he wrote.

But the implications of Givhan are considerable, and the opinion raises more questions than it answers. The opinion is, thus, both too clear and too obscure. A reading of the opinion may lead lower courts to ignore the extent to which the public-private distinction remains relevant in applying certain accepted justifications for restricting speech. In this sense the words say too much. On the other hand, a reading of Givhan may lead lower courts to underestimate its effect on the issue of academic freedom and on the issue of freedom of speech in the academic setting. On both the issue of private speech and the issue of speech in the schools much more remains to be said ... It is a pity that the brevity of the opinion leaves so much to speculation.

== See also ==
- List of United States Supreme Court cases
- List of United States Supreme Court cases by the Burger Court
- List of United States Supreme Court cases, volume 439
- List of United States Supreme Court cases involving the First Amendment
