= Wayne Davis (cornerback) =

American football player (1963–2008)

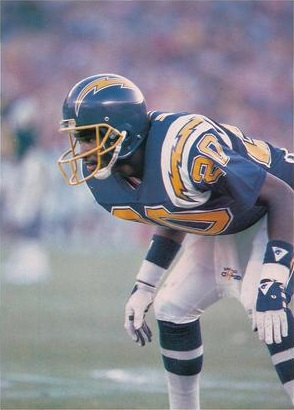
- Davis c. 1985

No. 20, 21, 26
- Position: Cornerback

Personal information
- Born: July 17, 1963; Cincinnati, Ohio, U.S.
- Died: March 16, 2008 (aged 44); Auburn, Georgia, U.S.
- Listed height: 5 ft 11 in (1.80 m)
- Listed weight: 175 lb (79 kg)

Career information
- High school: Mount Healthy (Mount Healthy, Ohio)
- College: Indiana State
- NFL draft: 1985: 2nd round, 39th overall pick

Career history
- San Diego Chargers (1985–1986); Buffalo Bills (1987–1988); San Francisco 49ers (1989)*; Buffalo Bills (1989); Washington Redskins (1989–1990)
- * Offseason or practice squad member only

Career NFL statistics
- Interceptions: 5
- Fumble recoveries: 1
- Sacks: 1
- Stats at Pro Football Reference

Wayne Elliot Davis (July 17, 1963 – March 16, 2008) was an American professional football cornerback in the National Football League (NFL) for the San Diego Chargers, the Buffalo Bills, and the Washington Redskins. He played college football at Indiana State University.

== Early life ==
Davis started his career as a running back and played high school football at Mount Healthy High School in Cincinnati, Ohio.

== College career ==
Davis played college football at Indiana State University, where he first started playing cornerback. Davis received three NCAA All-America honors in 1984, including the Missouri Valley Conference Defensive Player of the Year award. In 2002, he was inducted into the ISU Athletics Hall of Fame.

Davis was a member of Phi Beta Sigma fraternity.

== Professional career ==
Davis was drafted 39th overall in the second round of the 1985 NFL draft by the San Diego Chargers. He then had a six-year career in the NFL and played for the Chargers, Buffalo Bills and Washington Redskins. In his professional career, he totaled five interceptions in 73 games (14 starts).

He was a member of the 1988 AFC East Champions Buffalo Bills, appearing in both post-season games for the Bills.

Davis died of amyotrophic lateral sclerosis on March 16, 2008, at the age of 44.
