= Michael Gottesman =

Michael Gottesman may refer to:

- Michael Gottesman (lawyer), lawyer and law professor
- Michael M. Gottesman (born 1946), scientist
