= Mt. Healthy City School District Board of Education v. Doyle =

1977 U.S. Supreme Court case establishing mixed-motive test

- Supreme Court of the United States

Argued November 3, 1976 Decided January 11, 1977
- Full case name: Mt. Healthy City School District Board of Education et al v. Fred Doyle
- Docket no.: 75-1278
- Citations: 429 U.S. 274 (more) 97 S. Ct. 568; 50 L. Ed. 2d 471
- Argument: Oral argument
- Opinion announcement: Opinion announcement

Case history
- Prior: Aff'd in part and vac'd in part, per curiam, 529 F.2d 524 (6th Cir., 1975); certiorari granted, 425 U.S. 933.
- Subsequent: Judgement for defendants aff'd, per curiam, 670 F.2d 29 (6th Cir., 1982)

Holding
- School district was not an arm of the state and thus could not claim immunity from suit in federal court under Eleventh Amendment; once plaintiff has proved they engaged in activity protected under the First Amendment, government must show by preponderance of evidence that adverse employment action would have occurred for other, permissible reasons. Sixth Circuit vacated and remanded.

Court membership
- Chief Justice Warren E. Burger Associate Justices William J. Brennan Jr. · Potter Stewart; Byron White · Thurgood Marshall; Harry Blackmun · Lewis F. Powell Jr. William Rehnquist · John P. Stevens

Case opinion
- Majority: Rehnquist, joined by unanimous

Laws applied
- U.S. Const. amends. I, XI and XIV

Mt. Healthy City School District Board of Education v. Doyle, 429 U.S. 274 (1977), often shortened to Mt. Healthy v. Doyle, was a unanimous U.S. Supreme Court decision arising from a fired teacher's lawsuit against his former employer, the Mount Healthy City Schools. The Court considered three issues: whether federal-question jurisdiction existed in the case, whether the Eleventh Amendment barred federal lawsuits against school districts, and whether the First and Fourteenth Amendments prevented the district, as a government agency, from firing or otherwise disciplining an employee for constitutionally protected speech on a matter of public concern where the same action might have taken place for other, unprotected activities. Justice William Rehnquist wrote the opinion.

The case was first heard in the Southern District of Ohio. In 1971, Fred Doyle, who had been teaching social studies for five years in the Mount Healthy City Schools, learned his contract had not been renewed, not only denying him tenure but any further employment with the district. The superintendent's letter cited both an incident where he had made an obscene gesture to students and his sharing of a district dress code for teachers with a local radio station as displaying a "lack of tact". He took a position with another district and filed suit under Section 1983, arguing his constitutional rights to free speech had been violated, per the Court's 1967 decision in Pickering v. Board of Education, another case involving an untenured teacher fired for speaking out in the media. After the district court ruled in his favor, the school district appealed to the Sixth Circuit Court of Appeals, which partially vacated the decision in a brief per curiam opinion late in 1975.

The Supreme Court took the case and heard oral argument almost a year later. It handed down its decision early in 1977. On the jurisdictional question, Rehnquist held that although the school district had been created by state law, it was primarily a local entity and thus beyond the reach of the Eleventh Amendment, its first ruling in that area in 86 years. The Court did not, however, decide the question of whether Doyle had been fired legally, since there were other incidents suggesting he had difficulties in his relationships with students and fellow teachers which the district had introduced into the record. Instead, it remanded the case to the district court, ordering it to require the district to show by a preponderance of evidence that Doyle would have been fired regardless if he had not contacted the radio station. The school district was later able to do so, and in 1982 the Sixth Circuit upheld that decision.

The case introduced what has since become known as the "Mt. Healthy test" into similar cases that follow the Pickering line in asserting the First Amendment rights of public employees where the employer claims other, unprotected conduct motivated the adverse action, a two-prong process that shifts the burden of proof from plaintiff to defendant in the course of the action. First, the plaintiff must prove that the activity they were allegedly disciplined for was indeed protected speech. The defendant must then show by a preponderance that the adverse action would have occurred if the protected activity had never happened. This has been criticized as allowing public employers a way to circumvent restrictions on taking adverse action against whistleblowers, and more generally as incompatible with the underlying principles of tort law. The test has also been expanded into mixed motive discrimination cases in employment law.

== Underlying dispute ==
Doyle had begun teaching in Mt. Healthy, Ohio, a suburb of Cincinnati, in 1966. His one-year contract with the school system was renewed three times; in 1969 the contract term was extended to two years. Were it to be renewed, Doyle also expected to be granted tenure and commit to teaching at Mt. Healthy for the long term.

During the 1970 school year, he served as president of the school's Teachers' Association, and worked to expand the subjects of negotiations between it and the school board. The following year he was on the association's executive board. During this time relations between the association and the board were reportedly very tense, and Doyle was at the center of several incidents during 1970. As the Court recounted them:

In one instance, he engaged in an argument with another teacher which culminated in the other teacher's slapping him. Doyle subsequently refused to accept an apology and insisted upon some punishment for the other teacher. His persistence in the matter resulted in the suspension of both teachers for one day, which was followed by a walkout by a number of other teachers, which in turn resulted in the lifting of the suspensions.

On other occasions, Doyle got into an argument with employees of the school cafeteria over the amount of spaghetti which had been served him; referred to students, in connection with a disciplinary complaint, as "sons of bitches"; and made an obscene gesture to two girls (Note: The gesture in question was the "Hook 'em Horns" sign commonly associated with the University of Texas; it was at the time considered obscene in the Cincinnati area. The girls responded with the more universally recognized raised middle finger. Brief for Respondent, Mount Healthy (No. 75-1278), 1976 WL 181614, at *7, as cited at Hornbeck, William (October 26, 2013). "An Unhealthy Inquiry: First Amendment Retaliation Goes to Prison". American Criminal Law Review. Archived from the original on February 2, 2014.) in connection with their failure to obey commands made in his capacity as cafeteria supervisor.

In February 1971 the principal circulated a memo to all employees outlining a new dress code, apparently motivated by the administration's belief that public support for the district's bond issues was in part motivated by the teachers' appearance. Doyle, as an association official, had been aware that the administration was considering such a measure but had been led to believe that the association would have had some input before it was announced. He thus shared the memo with a friend at Cincinnati radio station WSAI, which used it as the basis for an on-air news item.

Doyle later apologized to the principal, saying he should have expressed his concerns over the administration's handling of the issue privately before making the memo public. A month later the district's superintendent made his annual recommendations to the board on whether to renew the contracts of untenured faculty. Doyle was one of nine whom he did not recommend rehiring, and the board accepted the recommendations and voted not to renew the contracts, denying Doyle tenure and terminating his employment with the Mt. Healthy schools.

Doyle asked for a reason he had not been rehired, and later received a short written note. The board cited his "notable lack of tact in handling professional matters which leaves much doubt as to your sincerity in establishing good school relationships." It pointed to two specific instances of this: his obscene gesture to the girls in the cafeteria and his leaking of the dress-code memo which "raised much concern not only within this community, but also in neighboring communities."

== Lower courts ==
Shortly after the school year ended Doyle accepted another teaching position, for less pay but with tenure, at Miami Trace High School, midway between Cincinnati and Columbus. He and two of the other fired teachers brought suit in federal court for the Southern District of Ohio, seeking reinstatement, back pay and $50,000 in punitive damages for violations of their civil rights under Section 1983. They named as defendants the board as a governmental entity, its members and the superintendent individually in their official and personal capacities. Judge Timothy Sylvester Hogan heard the case.

The school district's defenses were primarily procedural, in particular challenging whether federal courts had the jurisdiction over it in this case. Doyle relied on the Court's 1968 Pickering v. Board of Education decision, in which it unanimously held in favor of an untenured Illinois teacher fired for writing a letter skeptical of a school tax increase to a local newspaper, to assert his First Amendment rights against similar retaliatory action by the Mt. Healthy board. That case, however, had been appealed to the Supreme Court from the Illinois Supreme Court, having originated in that state's courts.

For two reasons, the school district claimed, there was no federal jurisdiction. First, as an "arm of the state", under the Eleventh Amendment, it was entitled to the same sovereign immunity since Ohio law did not consent to litigation against school districts for violations of constitutional rights. Second; Since Doyle had taken another job so soon after his dismissal, his lost wages were minimal and thus the amount in controversy was less than the $10,000 required for federal jurisdiction.

It raised two other defenses that addressed Doyle's substantive claims. In 1972's Board of Regents of State Colleges v. Roth, the Court had held that an untenured professor did not have a due process claim over the nonrenewal of his contract (as opposed to a dismissal prior to the expiration of the contract term) without a property or liberty interest at stake. Therefore, the district argued, neither did Doyle. And even if he did, his history of misconduct and intemperate outbursts was sufficient justification for his termination.

Hogan ruled in Doyle's favor on every issue; although he dismissed the case against the board members as individual defendants. The statute creating school districts had effectively waived any Eleventh Amendment protection. And since Doyle had filed his suit under the section of the law that creates federal-question jurisdiction, limitations such as the amount in controversy did not apply. He felt Pickering gave him no leeway to decide whether Doyle would have been fired without leaking the memo, an act which he found had played "a substantial role" in the board's decision. Doyle was to be reinstated and reimbursed over $5,000 in back pay plus $6,000 in attorney's fees.

The district appealed the verdict to the Sixth Circuit Court of Appeals. In late 1975, the appellate court affirmed all of Hogan's decision save for attorney's fees, which per the Supreme Court's recent decision in Alyeska Pipeline Svc. Co. v. Wilderness Soc'y it believed were not a permissible award in the case. The district petitioned the Supreme Court for certiorari, and it was granted early the following year.

== Before the Court ==
In their reply brief, the school board raised the issue of whether or nor the district itself was a "person" that could be sued under Section 1983. At trial, Hogan had ruled that since the case had been filed under the statute allowing for federal-question jurisdiction, it was properly a 1983 case as well and was not subject to any limitations of that statute. In a string of cases brought against local governments dating to 1961's Monroe v. Pape, it had held that they were not "persons" and could not be sued under 1983. Three years earlier, in a case similar to Doyle's, a district court in Colorado had held that school districts were not persons under those precedents, and it was this case the district relied on.

Oral argument was scheduled for late in 1976. Philip Olinger, the school district's lawyer, argued their case. Michael Gottesman appeared for Doyle.

=== Argument for board ===
No sooner had Olinger finished his review of the facts of the case when Justice William Rehnquist began questioning him about the nature of school districts in Ohio, using Rehnquist's native Arizona as a point of comparison. Were the boards named as defendants in lawsuits? Who paid verdicts against them? Were they provided for by the state constitution? What was their authority to tax and how much money did the state contribute to them? In his native Virginia, Justice Lewis Powell noted, school board members were "constitutional officers." Olinger told him that was as far as he knew not the case in Ohio.

When he was able to turn to the specifics of the case, Olinger reminded the justices that Hogan had agreed that, other than Doyle's contact with WSAI, the board had ample reason not to renew his contract. The rest of the argument focused on the jurisdictional issues. Olinger said that the difference between Doyle's salaries at Mt. Healthy and Miami Trace was too small to reach the $10,000 threshold. Pressed by one of the justices, he admitted that he was not taking into account the difference it might have made over the course of several years of employment; however he said it was entirely possible that Doyle's potential top salary step at his new school would be higher than it might be at Mt. Healthy.

Olinger explained to the court that language in Ohio's 1912 constitution allowing the legislature to pass laws under which the state could be sued had, shortly after its adoption, raised the question among the state's legal community of whether Ohio had, by doing so, surrendered its sovereign immunity. After a series of cases on this question, the Ohio Supreme Court had held in 1922, following the Court's Hans v. Louisiana decision, that if the state were to do so, it would have to be by a specific act of the legislature. He dismissed Doyle's suggestion that the Court, as it had done with the Fourth Amendment in Bivens v. Six Unknown Named Agents, find an implied cause of action in the Fourteenth Amendment that would allow lawsuits regardless of any statutory provision. Lastly, he reminded the justices that, when Section 1983 was adopted, Congress rejected an amendment explicitly allowing for actions against states and local governments.

=== Argument for Doyle ===
While he understood the jurisdictional issue was most important to them and planned to discuss it first, Gottesman told the justices, he hoped to spend some time on the facts of the case. He conceded that the implied cause of action he saw was not necessary to establish jurisdiction. Rather, it had been a response to the school district's late argument that it was not a person under Section 1983, and that he should have cross-appealed Hogan's ruling, in which he dismissed the case against the individual members as defendants, but did not because he did not expect that issue to arise again.

But he begged the Court's indulgence because under Kenosha v. Bruno, another one of the cases following Monroe, if the school district had the same Eleventh Amendment immunity as a municipality Doyle could not seek equitable relief such as his reinstatement against the board as an entity; he would have had to do it against the members personally. If the case were remanded in its present state, he said, he would be unable to proceed even if he won on all the other issues. Since Congress had changed the federal-question statute since Bivens, he felt that created the implied cause of action from the enabling language in the Fourteenth Amendment.

"It may be the most important civil rights question this court is going to have decide [sic] in the next decade", Gottesman reminded the justices. "The lower courts are deciding this issue by the legions." Nevertheless, he allowed that they might want to wait for a case where the issue was briefed by both parties.

Having devoted most of his time to the jurisdictional arguments, he asked for some time to speak about the merits near the end. "If we only knew what the school board would have done but for the phone call [to WSAI]," Gottesman suggested, "we know how to ... deal with this case." The Court should follow precedent from civil-rights and labor law and put the burden of proving that on the defendant. Otherwise, "every school board that wants to fire someone for a First Amendment reason, well ... no teacher can teach for five years without doing something somebody would find objectionable. Even though their motivation is solely the First Amendment reason, they'll tack on two or three other reasons." At a justice's prompting, he likened it to the harmless error rule in appellate review.

== Opinion of the Court ==
Two months later, early in 1977, the Court handed down its decision. The justices had unanimously ruled in Doyle's favor on all the jurisdictional questions. And on the merits, they said, the school district would have to prove that it would have fired him for reasons unrelated to his leaking the memo to the radio station.

=== Procedural issues ===
Justice William Rehnquist wrote for the Court. First, he said, the amount in controversy did not defeat Doyle's claim to jurisdiction since "[e]ven if the District Court had chosen to award only compensatory damages and not reinstatement, it was far from a 'legal certainty' at the time of suit that Doyle would not have been entitled to more than $10,000. "Rehnquist agreed with Gottesman that the possibility of an implied cause of action in the Fourteenth Amendment was an important question, yet "one that should not be decided on this record."

Since Doyle had made the suggestion in response to the board's late resurrection of its claim to non-personhood, Rehnquist dealt with that. Had the board properly preserved the issue, he noted, the Court would have been obliged to decide it. But it had not, and since Doyle's claim to federal-question jurisdiction seemed like a legitimate constitutional issue and not one claimed for the sole purpose of obtaining federal jurisdiction, "we leave those questions for another day, and assume, without deciding, that the respondent could sue under § 1331 without regard to the limitations imposed by 42 U.S.C. § 1983." (Note: A year later, in Monell v. Department of Social Services of the City of New York, 436 U.S. 658 (1978), the Court took up that question and decided that municipalities were persons under Section 1983, overruling Monroe v. Pape.)

The Court had chosen a different approach to the Eleventh Amendment question. Rather than agree with Hogan that Ohio had waived sovereign immunity for its school districts through the statute that had created them, "we prefer to address instead the question of whether such an entity had any Eleventh Amendment immunity in the first place, since if we conclude that it had none it will be unnecessary to reach the question of waiver," Rehnquist wrote. Ohio law itself was very clear—the state did not include local "political subdivisions" and the school district was a political subdivision. While it received guidance and some money from the state Department of Education, it was one of many local school districts in the state and had broad authority to levy property taxes and issue bonds financed by those tax revenues. "On balance, the record before us indicates that a local school board such as petitioner is more like a county or city than it is like an arm of the state ... it was not entitled to assert any Eleventh Amendment immunity from suit in the federal courts."

=== Substantive issues ===
Rehnquist then turned to the merits of the case. After recounting in some detail Doyle's history of intemperate behavior in his years at Mt. Healthy and the contact with the radio station, he rejected the board's argument that Roth barred Doyle's claim since he did not have tenure. Instead he followed Roth's companion case, Perry v. Sindermann, another case Gottesman had argued, with distinct similarities to Doyle's. In Perry, a Texas public junior college professor who had, like Doyle, been president of a faculty organization that clashed with the administration, challenged the nonrenewal of his contract. In contrast to Roth, the Court had ruled that he had alleged enough facts to make an arguable case that the nonrenewal was retaliatory action for his speech on a matter of public concern, and so it would for Doyle.

Lastly Rehnquist considered Hogan's admission that while he read Pickering as mandating that Doyle be reinstated with tenure and back pay for the board's violation of his constitutional rights, there were certainly other reasons the board could have cited to justify the firing that were not constitutionally actionable. Since under state law the board did not even have to show cause for the nonrenewal, "it is not clear what the District Court meant by this latter statement." The only "plausible" meaning Rehnquist could divine was that the board could have fired Doyle anyway even if he had never called the radio station.

In that case, Rehnquist went on, it would not necessarily have been a constitutional violation for an adverse action to have resulted even significantly from protected activity. The Court did not want to leave that reading in place, since it would allow a misbehaving employee to insulate themselves from adverse action by engaging in protected conduct.

The constitutional principle at stake is sufficiently vindicated if such an employee is placed in no worse a position than if he had not engaged in the conduct. A borderline or marginal candidate should not have the employment question resolved against him because of constitutionally protected conduct. But that same candidate ought not to be able, by engaging in such conduct, to prevent his employer from assessing his performance record and reaching a decision not to rehire on the basis of that record, simply because the protected conduct makes the employer more certain of the correctness of its decision.

It was, Rehnquist wrote, necessary to establish a test for future such cases. He looked to other areas of the law to formulate one. In two prior criminal cases, Lyons v. Oklahoma and Parker v. North Carolina the Court had allowed the use of later confessions or statements by defendants even where earlier ones had been coercively obtained as long as the later statements appeared otherwise voluntarily given. "While the type of causation on which the taint cases turn may differ somewhat from that which we apply here, those cases do suggest that the proper test to apply in the present context is one which likewise protects against the invasion of constitutional rights without commanding undesirable consequences not necessary to the assurance of those rights." Since Doyle had met his burden of showing that one of the actions for which the board terminated him was constitutionally protected speech, "the District Court should have gone on to determine whether the Board had shown by a preponderance of the evidence that it would have reached the same decision as to respondent's re-employment even in the absence of the protected conduct." The Court could not determine this from the available record, so it vacated the Sixth Circuit and remanded the case to District Court to facilitate that inquiry.

== Subsequent proceedings ==
On remand, Hogan did as the Supreme Court ordered. He concluded that "the Board has established by a preponderance of the evidence that Doyle would not have been renewed because of the incidents—exclusive of the radio incident—which had occurred during the year or so prior to the nonrenewal" and ruled in its favor. Doyle appealed this finding of fact to the Sixth Circuit.

A panel composed of the circuit's chief judge at the time, George Clifton Edwards, Jr., Albert J. Engel, Jr. and senior judge John Weld Peck II heard arguments in late 1981. A little over a month later, four years and two days after the Supreme Court's decision in the case, they issued a brief per curiam opinion that largely recounted the history of the case to that point. "We read this record as disclosing that while appellant Doyle had some fine qualities as a teacher, he also had a very quick temper," they wrote. "[W]e cannot find that the district judge's finding of fact on remand is clearly erroneous." They affirmed his decision.

== Subsequent jurisprudence ==
Later cases that rely on Mt. Healthy have largely concerned the eponymous test derived from the case. The Supreme Court expanded its application to other areas of the law, for now leaving it to the appeals courts to wrestle with the specifics.

=== Supreme Court ===
Two years later, the Court was able to reinforce the "Mt. Healthy test" in another, very similar case. Givhan v. Western Line Consolidated School District came on appeal from the Fifth Circuit, which had upheld the firing of a Mississippi teacher for, in part, her regular and vehement complaints to her principal about the racially disparate impact of school-district policies in the wake of court-ordered desegregation. The appeals court distinguished the case from Pickering and Mt. Healthy by noting that her complaints, despite involving a matter of public concern, had been made privately.

Rehnquist, again writing for a unanimous court, held that the context of the speech made no difference under the First Amendment; it was as protected as Pickering's letter and Doyle's telephone call. The Fifth Circuit, writing before the Supreme Court had decided Mt. Healthy, had been in much the same position with regards to the factual record with regards to the Supreme Court in Mt. Healthy. "while the District Court found that petitioner's 'criticism' was the 'primary' reason for the School District's failure to rehire her, it did not find that she would have been rehired but for her criticism." It remanded the case to the district court again to resolve that issue; unlike Doyle, Givhan ultimately triumphed.

Over the course of the 1980s the Court would extend the test to claims alleging other improper adverse employment action in the private sector as well. In National Labor Relations Board v. Transportation Management Co., it unanimously endorsed the board's use of the test in upholding its ruling in favor of a bus-company employee alleging he was fired for his attempts to organize a union, contrary to the other reasons claimed by the company. Two years later, Rehnquist again wrote for a unanimous Court that, Mt. Healthy "suppl[ies] the proper analysis" in 1985's Hunter v. Underwood, finding Alabama's felony disenfranchisement laws were primarily meant to target black voters even if they also affected poor whites.

The Court extended the Mt. Healthy test to private-sector mixed motive discrimination claims in 1989 with Price Waterhouse v. Hopkins. There, Justice William J. Brennan, Jr. wrote for a plurality that clarified the language it had used in Givhan: "A court that finds for a plaintiff under this standard has effectively concluded that an illegitimate motive was a 'but-for' cause of the employment decision." The decision's imposition of a shift in the burden of proof from plaintiff to defendant once the former has proved that an improper reason motivated the adverse action was criticized in Anthony Kennedy's dissent as only narrowly applicable to such cases.

=== Appeals courts ===
By 1992 the Fifth Circuit could assert that "the two-step burden-shifting rule ... has now become standard fare in discrimination cases" in the third and final appeal by a Mississippi newspaper alleging that local government withdrew legal advertising in retaliation for critical coverage. The district court had found the first-ever application of the test to a case involving denial of public patronage "strained"; Judge John Robert Brown disagreed, saying it was" broad enough potentially to lend itself to a wide variety of fact patterns" and remanded the case.

In a pair of cases, the Seventh Circuit has dealt with how and when to instruct a jury that is given the Mt. Healthy test to apply. In Greenberg v. Kmetko it directed a district court to change its instruction to more closely match the test should the case be heard by a jury, even though it had granted qualified immunity to the defendants. Frank Easterbrook observed in 1992's Gooden v. Neal, where a correctional officer alleged he had been demoted in retaliation for exposing corruption, that "[m]any defendants do not want Mt. Healthy instructions and prefer to ask an either-or question of the jury" since they also contend the activity the adverse action was in retaliation for was not protected by the First Amendment. "Mt. Healthy is something of a misfit in such circumstances." In that case, where the employer denied that the plaintiff's speech was in any way related to the adverse decision, they chose to shift the burden of proof of that to the employer as well, an approach Donald P. Lay of the Eighth Circuit, sitting by designation, criticized at length in dissent. In 2002, the Ninth Circuit held that the test still applies when a plaintiff presents only a circumstantial case that the adverse action was retaliatory as opposed to a direct one.

"In the aftermath of Mt. Healthy," wrote Sandra Lynch for the First Circuit in 2004, "confusion still sometimes arises about the issue of causation." She was writing in one of several cases it heard in the mid-2000s arising from alleged political retaliation in Puerto Rico, where members of the New Progressive Party (NPP) brought suit claiming that members of the rival Popular Democratic Party (PDP) had improperly forced them out of government jobs after the PDP defeated the incumbent NPP in the commonwealth's 2000 elections. Many of them involved the correctness of jury instructions on the subject. Since the employer's defense largely rested on the illegality of personnel moves by the outgoing NPP so that its members could keep their jobs, Lynch elaborated:

There are obvious difficulties with this model, which the Supreme Court may one day address. The first is that when an employer asserts a Mt. Healthy defense in a political discrimination case, the trier of fact (absent a prior determination under state law) essentially becomes a kind of super-personnel board making determinations about whether particular personnel actions violated state or local personnel laws ... The second difficulty concerns whether the Supreme Court would in the end, once the illegality of the personnel action to be corrected had been established under local law, require an employer who had shown a consistently applied practice of remedying all such illegal appointments to show anything more.

Since the jury instructions had not included a direct question as to whether they found that the defendants would have taken the same action without the political consideration, the First Circuit overturned the jury's finding for the plaintiffs and remanded the case for retrial with a proper jury instruction.

In Tejada-Batista v. Morales, where a discharged Puerto Rico Special Investigations Bureau agent alleged retaliation by a superior for his contact with a local newspaper, then-Chief Judge Michael Boudin denied defendants' request that a Mt. Healthy instruction be allowed, as it was "not on point" since he did not feel they had introduced enough evidence to support a claim that there were permissible reasons to take adverse action. Gene Carter dissented, arguing that the verdict should have been reversed since the evidence suggested one of the named defendants had no knowledge of anything but the domestic violence charge that was the stated reason Tejada had been fired.

Judge Juan R. Torruella, in Rodriguez-Marin v. Rivera-Gonzalez, another of the political cases, characterized the Mt. Healthy test as an affirmative defense. In that case, not only did the court find that it was insufficient for the defendants to merely introduce evidence that would be sufficient for a jury to find that they had other reasons to take action against the plaintiffs, they had to show that a reasonable jury could have found for them. Similarly, the court held that a jury instruction that a finding that the plaintiffs' political affiliations and activities were the "determinative factor" in the defendants' actions against them met the test's requirements.

In 2011, the Second Circuit affirmed a successful use of the Mt. Healthy defense in a case where it had found one constitutionally protected speech act was a motivation for the adverse action. The plaintiff in Anemone v. Metropolitan Transportation Authority was the former head of security for the agency, who claimed his attempts to root out corruption in the agency had been ignored or frustrated by his superiors. At one point he had discussed it with a reporter from The New York Times, which eventually published a story about the allegations.

Judge Debra Ann Livingston wrote for a panel that took two years to decide the case. It found that while that act was constitutionally protected, the balancing test established by Pickering v. Board of Education actually improved the MTA's case under Mt. Healthy, since although it was speech on a matter of public concern it was disruptive to the MTA's operations since it breached the confidentiality the plaintiff was required to maintain about security matters and internal investigations as part of his job duties. Even if it had not been so disruptive, the court held, his record of insubordination and deception of several of the defendants was enough reason for him to have been disciplined and fired—indeed he had even admitted he believed his job to be in jeopardy before he had contacted the Times.

== Analysis and commentary ==
Three years after the decision, E. Gordon Gee, then a professor at West Virginia University College of Law, described it as a turning point in First Amendment jurisprudence.

Before Mt. Healthy, once a First Amendment violation was found, the Court proceeded no further in its analysis. Rather, freedom of speech, considered by the Court to be the core of all freedoms, was surrounded by stringent protections, which, when violated, supported awards of at least nominal damages, even where no actual harm could be shown. There were those who would have protected First Amendment rights at nearly any cost—the late Justice Hugo Black being the prime example. But, such a position has been abandoned for a new position in which First Amendment rights are not seen as absolute; the Court now perceives other considerations as also important.

He anticipated the later efforts of the First and Seventh circuits in working out how to implement the Mt. Healthy test: "The major effect of Mt. Healthy will be felt, and struggled with, in the trial courts. [It] provides little guidance ... on the amount and type of evidence required of the plaintiff to shift the burden of proof to the defendant."

Some tort-law specialists have been very critical of the burden-shifting test. Georgia law professor Michael L. Wells finds it at odds with the fundamental principles of tort law and thus wrongly decided. "It should be replaced by a rule that allows the plaintiff to recover full damages when the constitutional violation was sufficient to cause them." The Court, he wrote in 2000, could have found other causation tests in tort law that were fairer to the plaintiff than but-for, such as suffi. "It is especially ill-suited to constitutional torts charging retaliation for the exercise of First Amendment rights" since it ensures that an employee who speaks out on a matter of public concern will have to consider the possibility that his or her employer will find some plausible reasons for taking action against him apart from his protected speech or other activity.

Sheldon Nahmod of Chicago-Kent College of Law shares Wells's criticism. He points to one case in particular where the Court seemed to recognize the theory that constitutional violations should always be grounds for liability regardless of whatever other issues exist. In Carey v. Phipus, decided a year after Mt. Healthy, the Court held that two students challenging their suspensions were entitled to prove that their due process rights were violated as they alleged even if the suspensions themselves turned out to have been factually justified. While not a constitutional claim, he also looks to 1995's McKennon v. Nashville Banner Publishing Co., a case under the Age Discrimination in Employment Act, where an age discrimination verdict against a private employer was upheld even though the respondent had concededly met the Mt. Healthy burden with evidence of her wrongdoing because that evidence was discovered subsequent to the employee's termination.

Other commentators have focused on the Eleventh Amendment aspects. New York lawyer Anthony J. Harwood reads the decision as establishing, along with the 1979 case Lake County Estates v. Tahoe Regional Planning Board, a test to determine when a political subdivision is not an arm of the state and thus does not enjoy the state's sovereign immunity.

Viewed together, Lake County and Mount Healthy identify two subsets of factors relevant to the definition of a political subdivision. The first subset relates to whether the state, in creating the entity, intends that the entity partake of the state's immunity. This grouping includes the state's categorization of the entity as either an independent entity or an arm of the state, and the state's litigation behavior toward the entity. The second subset relates to whether the structure of the entity and its relationship to the state indicate that the entity exercises policy-making powers free from state control. Express provisions making the state liable for judgments against the entity and extensive state funding evince state control. By contrast, an entity's authority to levy taxes and issue bonds without obligating the state indicates that the entity is independent.

Despite the existence of this test, however, he notes that lower courts have generally followed Lincoln County v. Luning, the last case before Mt. Healthy to pose an Eleventh Amendment question to the Court regarding state political subdivisions, regardless of whether the case invokes federal-question or diversity jurisdiction. "This practice is contrary to the balance of state and federal interests that inheres in the Supreme Court's Eleventh Amendment doctrine."

== See also ==
- List of United States Supreme Court cases involving the First Amendment
- List of United States Supreme Court cases, volume 429
