= Borough of Duryea v. Guarnieri =

- Supreme Court of the United States

Argued March 22, 2011 Decided June 20, 2011
- Full case name: Borough of Duryea, Pennsylvania, et al., Petitioners v. Charles J. Guarnieri
- Docket no.: 09-1476
- Citations: 564 U.S. 379 (more) 131 S. Ct. 2488; 180 L. Ed. 2d 408

Case history
- Prior: Motion granted, unreported 3:05-CV-1422 (M.D. Pa. 2010); affirmed, 364 Fed. Appx. 749 (3d Cir. 2010); cert. granted, 562 U.S. 960 (2010).
- Subsequent: Further remanded to the district court, unreported (3d Cir. August 2, 2011)

Holding
- A petition must address a matter of public concern. Otherwise, a public employer is free to retaliate against the public employee, even if the employee won the grievance he filed and brought suit in federal court.

Court membership
- Chief Justice John Roberts Associate Justices Antonin Scalia · Anthony Kennedy; Clarence Thomas · Ruth Bader Ginsburg; Stephen Breyer · Samuel Alito; Sonia Sotomayor · Elena Kagan

Case opinions
- Majority: Kennedy, joined by Roberts, Ginsburg, Breyer, Alito, Sotomayor, Kagan
- Concurrence: Thomas
- Concur/dissent: Scalia

Laws applied
- U.S. Const. amend. I

Borough of Duryea v. Guarnieri, 564 U.S. 379 (2011), was a case in which the Supreme Court of the United States held the public concern test limits Petition Clause claims by public employees. More specifically, state and local government employees may not sue their employers for retaliation under the Petition Clause of the First Amendment when they petition the government on matters of private concern. To show that an employer interfered with rights under the Free Speech Clause of the First Amendment, an employee must show that his speech related to a matter of public concern. The court held that this test also applies when the employee invokes the Petition Clause. The case is significant under the Petition Clause because 1.) it recognized that lawsuits are “Petitions” under the First Amendment and 2.) it explains that the Petition Clause and Speech Clause are not always coextensive, and leaves open the possibility that there may be additional claims under the Petition Clause which plaintiffs may invoke consistent with the purpose of that Clause.

== Background ==
=== Termination and reinstatement ===
Charles Guarnieri was terminated as chief of police for the borough of Duryea, Pennsylvania. He filed a union grievance which proceeded to arbitration per the police union collective-bargaining agreement. The arbitrator found that procedural errors had been committed in connection with the termination of Guarnieri. The arbitrator also found misconduct on the part of Guarnieri. Guarnieri was ordered reinstated following a disciplinary suspension.

After Guarnieri was reinstated, he was issued a set of directives outlining Guarnieri's responsibilities in the performance of his duties. Guarnieri claimed his grievance was a petition protected by the Petition Clause of the First Amendment. He filed lawsuit against the borough, alleging that the directives were retaliation for that protected activity.

=== Lawsuit ===
During the lawsuit, the jury was instructed that the lawsuit and union grievance were "protected activity... under the constitution". The jury found for Guarnieri and awarded damages. The borough appealed on the ground that Guarnieri's lawsuit and grievance were not protected under the First Amendment as they did not address matters of public concern, a view affirmed by Courts outside the Third Circuit. The Court of Appeals concluded that "a public employee who has petitioned the government through a formal mechanism such as the filing of a lawsuit or grievance is protected under the Petition Clause from retaliation for that activity, even if the petition concerns a matter of solely private concern". The Supreme Court granted certiorari in order to rule on the conflicting interpretations of the Petition Clause.

== Opinion of the Court ==
The Court held that "a government employer's allegedly retaliatory actions against an employee do not give rise to liability under the Petition Clause unless the employee's petition relates to a matter of public concern."

=== Speech Clause ===
The Court had ruled in Connick v. Myers that a public employee must show he spoke as a citizen on a matter of public concern when suing his employer under the First Amendment's Speech Clause. After making this showing, the Court had stated in Pickering v. Board of Education that the court must balance the employee's right to engage in speech against the government's interest in being efficient and effective in the public services it performs. In this case, the Court outlined the close connection between the rights of speech and petition when making its ruling.

=== Petition Clause ===
The Court wrote that "the substantial government interests that justify a cautious and restrained approach to protecting public employees' speech are just as relevant in Petition Clause cases". The Court noted that holding a different standard for the Petition Clause could result in a loophole, as "petitions are a form of expression, and employees who invoke the Petition Clause in most cases could invoke as well the Speech Clause of the First Amendment".

=== Partial dissent ===
Justice Scalia concurred in the judgment in part and dissented in part. Scalia argued that the Court "has never actually held that a lawsuit is a constitutionally protected Petition". In this case the parties did not litigate on this issue and so the Court left it an open question. Scalia also argued against the holding Petition Clause and Speech clause being treated identically in public employment cases.

== See also ==
- Connick v. Myers
- Pickering v. Board of Education
- Garcetti v. Ceballos
