= Connick v. Myers =

- Supreme Court of the United States

Argued November 8, 1982 Decided April 20, 1983
- Full case name: Harry Connick Sr. v. Sheila Myers
- Docket no.: 81-1251
- Citations: 461 U.S. 138 (more) 103 S. Ct. 1684; 75 L. Ed. 2d 708
- Argument: Oral argument

Case history
- Prior: Judgment for plaintiff, 507 F. Supp. 752 (E.D. La. 1981); affirmed, 654 F.2d 719 (5th. Cir. 1981); cert. granted, 455 U.S. 999 (1982).

Holding
- Assistant district attorney's distribution of questionnaire on workplace satisfaction following an unwanted transfer was largely a matter of personal interest; her subsequent termination for that action did not violate her First Amendment rights. Fifth Circuit reversed

Court membership
- Chief Justice Warren E. Burger Associate Justices William J. Brennan Jr. · Byron White; Thurgood Marshall · Harry Blackmun; Lewis F. Powell Jr. · William Rehnquist; John P. Stevens · Sandra Day O'Connor

Case opinions
- Majority: White, joined by Burger, Powell, Rehnquist, O'Connor
- Dissent: Brennan, joined by Marshall, Blackmun, Stevens

Laws applied
- U.S. Const. amend. I

Connick v. Myers, 461 U.S. 138 (1983), is a United States Supreme Court decision concerning the First Amendment rights of public employees who speak on matters of possible public concern within the workplace context. It was first brought by Sheila Myers, an Orleans Parish, Louisiana, assistant district attorney (ADA). She had been fired by her superior, District Attorney Harry Connick Sr., when, after receiving a transfer she had fiercely resisted in private conversations with him and his chief assistant district attorney, she distributed a questionnaire to her fellow prosecutors asking about their experience with Connick's management practices. At trial, Judge Jack Gordon of the Eastern District of Louisiana found the firing had been motivated by the questionnaire and was thus an infringement on her right to speak out on matters of public concern as a public employee. After the Fifth Circuit affirmed the verdict, Connick appealed to the Supreme Court.

The justices reversed the lower courts by a 5–4 margin. Justice Byron White wrote for the majority that most of the matters Myers's questionnaire had touched on were of personal, not public, concern and that the action had damaged the harmonious relations necessary for the efficient operation of the district attorney's office. William Brennan argued in dissent that the majority's application of precedent was flawed. He argued that all the matters in the questionnaire were of public concern, and feared a chilling effect on speech by public employees about such matters would result.

The case was the first in a line considering the right of public employees to speak contemporaneously with their employment that had started with Pickering v. Board of Education (1968) fifteen years earlier in which the Court sided with the employee. It introduced the test of whether the employee's speech had been on matters of public concern to the balancing of employer and employee interest prescribed in the earlier case. The two would guide the Court's interpretation of later cases such as Rankin v. McPherson (1987). In the 1990s and 2000s, Waters v. Churchill (1994) and Garcetti v. Ceballos (2006), the latter with some similarities to the circumstances of Connick, would further clarify the Court's holding.

== Underlying dispute ==
By 1980, Myers had been an assistant district attorney for more than five years. She had been an effective trial attorney who had turned down promotions to remain in the courtroom. She had also participated in programs at law schools in the New Orleans area and participated in programs sponsored by Connick's office. A judge had also persuaded her to take part in a probation program for juvenile first offenders he ran.

In October of that year, Myers was told she would be transferred to the section run by that judge. She enjoyed the position she was in at the time, in another judge's section, and feared that if she were transferred she would have to recuse herself from cases where she had counseled defendants in the program. She expressed these concerns to Dennis Waldron, the chief assistant district attorney, and Bridget Bane, the head of training for the office.

She raised these concerns again in another meeting with Waldron and Connick about another subject. The next morning she received the formal memorandum making the transfer. At another meeting with Waldron, she repeated her unhappiness and broadened her concerns to include other issues in the office she was concerned about. She said Waldron told her that those concerns were not shared, to which she responded that she would research that.

That night she was unable to sleep. She instead prepared a questionnaire about her concerns for distribution to her coworkers. Early the next morning, she made 40 copies. Connick came in, canceling a day off, to discuss the transfer with her again. She told him she would "consider" the transfer.

At lunch she distributed the questionnaire to 17 other assistant district attorneys personally. Most accepted them. Waldron learned what was happening and called Connick about a "mini-insurrection" taking place. Connick was particularly disturbed by questions about whether respondents felt confident in Waldron, Bane and other supervisors, and about whether ADAs felt pressured to work on his political campaigns, feeling it would be damaging if it got into the media. He called Myers into his office and told her she was fired, effective at the end of the day. She continued to come in for another three days, putting her files and case notes in order.

== Litigation ==
Shortly after her dismissal, Myers filed a Section 1983 suit in federal court for the Eastern District of Louisiana, against Connick both personally and in his official capacity. She alleged violation of her First Amendment rights and sought back pay, reinstatement and compensatory and punitive damages. At first she sought a preliminary injunction, but Judge Jack Gordon converted it to a trial on the merits. It was held before him two months after the firing. Myers argued that she had been fired for distributing the questionnaire; Connick claimed it was a matter of her insubordination in refusing to accept the transfer.

Myers and Connick's attorneys, George Strickler and William Wessel respectively, would represent their clients throughout the case. Wessel was himself a former assistant district attorney, and had in that capacity been the first to interview Myers when she had applied to Connick's office. He shared his former superior's positive assessment of her prosecutorial skills.

In February 1981 Gordon issued his decision. After recounting the facts of the case, he found for Myers. "The preponderance of the evidence in this case," he wrote," indicates that the plaintiff was fired by the defendant because of her circulation of the questionnaire within the District Attorney's Office." He noted in support that another ADA testified that she had been preparing for her new cases with him, and that Connick had returned home after their morning meeting, satisfied with her answer. Only after Waldron's call about the questionnaire did he return and fire her.

Having established the facts, Gordon turned to the law. He applied the test from Mt. Healthy City Bd. of Ed. v. Doyle, a 1977 Supreme Court decision overturning the firing of a teacher for, among other things, sharing a proposed dress code with the media. First, Myers would have to prove that her distribution of the questionnaire was constitutionally protected speech, and that her firing was a result. If she could establish that, the burden would then be on Connick to show that she would have been fired whether she had distributed the questionnaire or not.

Gordon relied on Pickering v. Board of Education, for the first test. In that landmark 1968 case, the Court had unanimously overturned the firing of a teacher who had written a letter to the editor of a local newspaper criticizing the school board and superintendent for its allocation of school finances. Gordon quoted Thurgood Marshall's majority opinion: "'Statements by public officials on matters of public concern must be afforded First Amendment protection' even though the statements may be directed at the public officials' 'nominal superiors.'" In a more recent case, Givhan v. Western Line Consolidated School District, the Court had also held that the First Amendment protected private speech by public employees on matters of public concern. These two cases, Gordon wrote, established the possibility that her distribution of the questionnaires was constitutionally protected.

"Taken as a whole," Gordon continued," the issues presented in the questionnaire relate to the effective functioning of the District Attorney's Office and are matters of public importance and concern." He returned to Pickering, which further required a balancing test between Myers's free-speech interests and Connick's interest in the efficient operation of a public agency. A 1974 Fifth Circuit decision offered language that clarified this test: "[I]t is incumbent upon [the government] to clearly demonstrate that the employee's conduct substantially and materially interferes with the discharge of duties and responsibilities inherent in [public] employment." (Note: The decision upheld the firing of a clinical psychologist who had insisted on wearing a pin with a peace symbol while on the job at a veterans' hospital despite repeated requests from his superiors to stop, as it could have unnecessarily upset patients.) For specifics Gordon looked to a 1972 Seventh Circuit decision that had offered four areas where this balance might be considered: confidentiality, discipline and harmonious relations among coworkers, relations between the employee and his or her superior, and the extent to which employee speech affected job performance.

Connick had not alleged that Myers had breached confidentiality. He had claimed that Myers violated office policy and thus impeded her job performance by photocopying the questionnaires. Gordon said Connick had offered no evidence of an office policy on photocopier use. "Even had such evidence been offered," he added, "this court could not conclude that such an act carries much weight in regard to striking a balance in the state's favor."

Connick had also not shown any evidence that the distribution of the questionnaires on work time impeded her job performance. As an assistant district attorney, Gordon wrote, she was entitled to some latitude in her work hours. "There is no evidence to indicate that plaintiff was anything other than a hardworking, conscientious attorney who fulfilled the requirements imposed upon her by her job."

Gordon called the last area, the purported effect of the questionnaire on relations between superiors and supervised, "the defendant's most forceful argument." He agreed it was important, but did not believe, as Connick did, that the mere act of distributing a questionnaire which asked, among other things, whether respondents trusted four named supervisors, was as prejudicial to discipline as a negative statement about those individuals would be. He cited a similar case where a college professor had alleged his contract was not renewed because of his role in disseminating a questionnaire. "[It was] not a statement of fact but the presentation and solicitation of ideas and opinions" and thus even more clearly protected.

"When all factors are considered, it cannot be said that the defendant's interest in promoting the efficiency of the public services performed through his employees was either adversely affected or substantially impeded by plaintiff's distribution of the questionnaire", Gordon concluded. He thus found Myers had met her first test, and reiterated his finding of fact that she had been fired for the distribution of the questionnaire, which satisfied the second. Since that was the only possible reason he had found for her termination, it could not be alleged that she would have been fired without having done it, and thus she had won.

Gordon held that Connick was acting out of his official capacity, so he could not personally be held liable. He ordered her reinstated, although he worried that "it would be difficult for plaintiff to achieve a harmonious working relationship" due to the lawsuit, if she did. He also ordered back pay, $1,500 in compensatory damages, as well as costs and fees, but denied her declaratory relief and punitive damages, since there was no evidence that Connick had shown reckless or wanton disregard for her civil rights. Connick appealed to the Fifth Circuit, which summarily affirmed in mid-1981.

== Before the Court ==
Connick petitioned the Supreme Court for certiorari. In 1982 the Court granted the request. Strickler "had this sinking feeling", when he heard the news, since it meant at least four justices disagreed with the district court; likewise, Wessel said he knew Connick would win. The American Civil Liberties Union and National Education Association filed amicus curiae briefs for Myers urging affirmance. Oral arguments were held in November.

The justices' questions to both were primarily focused on clarifying the facts of the case and distinguishing it from the precedent cases. They focused on the sequence of events, and whether Gordon had properly balanced the two interests at stake.

Wessel took issue with the idea that Myers's assignment could seriously be a matter of public interest. "[C]ertainly the public is not interested in which assistant district attorney worked in Section A or Section I of the criminal district court." Not even the question asking if ADAs had felt pressured to work on Connick's campaigns, which he described as "thrown in", were of public interest, he argued, since they were not civil service positions.

Strickler challenged Wessel's insistence that Myers had been fired for her refusal to accept the transfer. Gordon had found differently, he said, because the record did not suggest that she had done so, and that she was planning to accept it. "Since the petitioner cannot really do anything with those facts," he said, "he urges this Court to hold as a matter of law that the content of this questionnaire was so totally devoid of value as to be per se unfit for protection under the First Amendment." William Rehnquist asked him if the public interest argument would have covered the questionnaire had it been limited only to the question of whether the respondent trusted Connick's four lieutenants. Strickler noted in reply that none of them had said that impacted their working relationship with Myers. Connick, he added later, hadn't even consulted her immediate supervisor before firing her.

== Decision ==
The Court announced its decision on April 20, 1983. By a 5-4 margin it had upheld Connick's firing of Myers, holding that her First Amendment rights had not been violated and the district court had imposed an overly onerous burden on him. Justice Byron White wrote for a majority that also included Chief Justice Warren Burger, Lewis Powell, Sandra Day O'Connor and William Rehnquist. William Brennan's dissent was signed by Harry Blackmun, Thurgood Marshall and John Paul Stevens.

=== Majority opinion ===
"The District Court got off on the wrong foot in this case" White wrote, when it found that all the matters on the questionnaire had been of public concern. He noted that Pickering had been very emphatic in making that qualification, and reviewed the history of the law in that area.

For most of the 20th century, judges had followed a maxim of Oliver Wendell Holmes when he found in favor of the city of New Bedford as a justice of the Massachusetts Supreme Judicial Court: "The petitioner may have a constitutional right to talk politics, but he has no constitutional right to be a policeman." Throughout the early 20th century the Supreme Court had held similarly. Around the beginning of the McCarthy era in the middle of the century, as public employees were required to sign loyalty oaths and deny or repudiate past membership in the Communist Party or similar organizations, the Court sided with challenges to those laws, often by holding them too vague to be enforceable. These culminated in Keyishian v. Board of Regents, where the Court struck down a broad range of New York statutes and regulations requiring faculty at state-run colleges and universities to certify that they had never been members of the Communist Party. (Note: In that case Brennan had written the majority opinion, and White had joined Tom Clark's dissent.)

Pickering had built on those cases and established a new line, that concerning public employees' right to speak on matters of public concern. "[These cases] lead us to conclude that, if Myers' questionnaire cannot be fairly characterized as constituting speech on a matter of public concern, it is unnecessary for us to scrutinize the reasons for her discharge", White wrote.

When employee expression cannot be fairly considered as relating to any matter of political, social, or other concern to the community, government officials should enjoy wide latitude in managing their offices, without intrusive oversight by the judiciary in the name of the First Amendment. Perhaps the government employer's dismissal of the worker may not be fair, but ordinary dismissals from government service which violate no fixed tenure or applicable statute or regulation are not subject to judicial review even if the reasons for the dismissal are alleged to be mistaken or unreasonable.

The majority did not find most of Myers's questions, those relating to transfer policies within the office, to be likely matters of public concern. "Indeed, the questionnaire, if released to the public, would convey no information at all other than the fact that a single employee is upset with the status quo." Rather, White said, Myers's real aim had been "to gather ammunition for another round of controversy with her superiors. These questions reflect one employee's dissatisfaction with a transfer and an attempt to turn that displeasure into a cause célèbre ... While, as a matter of good judgment, public officials should be receptive to constructive criticism offered by their employees, the First Amendment does not require a public office to be run as a roundtable for employee complaints over internal office affairs."

Myers's question on whether employees felt pressured to work on campaigns did, White agreed, touch on a legitimate public concern. For that reason the Court had to determine whether the firing was justified nevertheless. White found Gordon's burden on Connick "unduly onerous". The district court judge, he wrote, had failed to take into account language in Pickering that said the state's burden in showing that the employee's speech impaired his or her ability to discharge official duties varies with the nature of the speech.

While Gordon had properly found that Connick had offered no convincing evidence that Myers's own job responsibilities had been affected, White disagreed that there had been no impact on her working relationships with Connick or her coworkers. "When close working relationships are essential to fulfilling public responsibilities, a wide degree of deference to the employer's judgment is appropriate", White wrote. "Furthermore, we do not see the necessity for an employer to allow events to unfold to the extent that the disruption of the office and the destruction of working relationships is manifest before taking action." (Note: White did qualify this latter point: "We caution that a stronger showing may be necessary if the employee's speech more substantially involved matters of public concern.")

White rejected Gordon's analysis of the questionnaire as less subversive than outright criticism. "Questions, no less than forcefully stated opinions and facts, carry messages and it requires no unusual insight to conclude that the purpose, if not the likely result, of the questionnaire is to seek to precipitate a vote of no confidence in Connick and his supervisors." Following Givhan, he also found the time, place and manner relevant, since Myers had distributed her questionnaire in the office during work hours, shortly after her meeting with Connick, timing Myers said was intentional on her part. "When employee speech concerning office policy arises from an employment dispute concerning the very application of that policy to the speaker, additional weight must be given to the supervisor's view that the employee has threatened the authority of the employer to run the office."

"The limited First Amendment interest involved here," White began his conclusion, "does not require that Connick tolerate action which he reasonably believed would disrupt the office, undermine his authority, and destroy close working relationships." He said the decision was not a narrowing of free speech rights but a reasonable response to the facts of the case. "[I]t would indeed be a Pyrrhic victory for the great principles of free expression if the Amendment's safeguarding of a public employee's right, as a citizen, to participate in discussions concerning public affairs were confused with the attempt to constitutionalize the employee grievance that we see presented here."

=== Dissent ===
"It is hornbook law," Brennan wrote, "that speech about 'the manner in which government is operated or should be operated' is an essential part of the communications necessary for self-governance the protection of which was a central purpose of the First Amendment." Unlike the majority, he believed that Myers's questionnaire raised issues worthy of constitutional protection.

He found the majority's holding "flawed in three respects":

- it read Pickering to hold that the context of a statement should be considered not only in assessing whether it impaired a public employee's work function but also whether it was a matter of public interest;
- it did not consider the effect of personnel policies on the efficiency of the district attorney's office to be a matter of public concern, and
- it misapplied the Pickering balancing test by holding that Myers could have been properly fired even though one of her concerns was undeniably a matter of public interest without evidence that her conduct disrupted the office.

Brennan chastised the majority for using Givhan in this case to distinguish between speech on subjects of inherent public concern and issues of public import that might become public concern. He thought the context of the speech was irrelevant, pointing in a footnote to the extensive media coverage the incident received, as well as other coverage of the internal operations of Connick's office, in the Times-Picayune, New Orleans' daily newspaper. "The First Amendment affords special protection to speech that may inform public debate about how our society is to be governed—regardless of whether it actually becomes the subject of a public controversy."

Although all five of the supervisors named in the questionnaire had testified at trial that they could continue working with Myers were she to return, the majority had given greater weight to what it held to be Connick's reasonable belief that the distribution of the questionnaire would adversely affect his authority. "Such extreme deference to the employer's judgment is not appropriate" for public employment, Brennan responded. He pointed to Tinker v. Des Moines Independent Community School District, the landmark free-speech case in which the Court had upheld the right of high-school students to wear black armbands to school in protest against the Vietnam War. In that case a majority had held that the school officials' fear that the armbands would be disruptive, without any other evidence, did not justify prohibiting them. He did not see a difference in this case.

"The Court's decision today inevitably will deter public employees from making critical statements about the manner in which government agencies are operated for fear that doing so will provoke their dismissal," Brennan said, in conclusion. "As a result, the public will be deprived of valuable information with which to evaluate the performance of elected officials."

== Aftermath ==
Sheila Myers continued practicing law and still does criminal defense work in New Orleans. Two decades later, in 2001, she said she had never expected her case to become the precedent it did. "I do believe that a positive outcome for me from the case is that people believe me when I say that I'm going to do something", she said. "I think people believe that I will stand up for what I believe in." However, she says public employees were "disserved" by it and hopes to live to see the decision overturned.

She and Connick, as well as Waldron, who later became a state criminal court judge, remained on good terms. "It is kind of ironic that we are all still around," Myers says. "When I see them, I speak and they speak. I think there is a level of mutual respect." Connick, too, who served as district attorney until 2003, also was surprised it reached the nation's highest court. "All of this free-speech foolishness was nonsense ... An employer should be able to fire an employee who fails to follow orders, plain and simple."

== Subsequent jurisprudence ==
Because of the difference in circumstances and its opposite holding, Connick was considered as the complement of Pickering, establishing a test that required determining whether the employee's speech was on a matter of public concern. The Court has revisited the issue in three cases since 1983. White's caution against constitutionalizing every public employment dispute has also informed two cases on the Fourth Amendment rights of public employees in internal investigations.

=== Rankin v. McPherson ===
Four years later, in 1987, the Court again had to consider whether a public employee's speech could constitutionally cost her her job. The respondent in Rankin v. McPherson was a Harris County, Texas, deputy constable, newly hired and on probationary status in 1981, when she heard about the assassination attempt on President Ronald Reagan. She told a coworker that "if they go for him again, I hope they get him". Another deputy constable who overheard it told the constable, who fired her.

A 5-4 majority found that her First Amendment rights had been violated. Thurgood Marshall wrote that the speech was on a clear matter of public concern, the president's health. Applying Connick and considering the context, he held that the statement was not disruptive to the function of the constable's office (Note: Rankin, he noted, had not even argued that it was.) and therefore was protected speech. Lewis Powell, a member of the Connick majority, wrote in a separate concurrence that it was so private as to not even need the analysis required by that case. "It will be an unusual case where the employer's legitimate interests will be so great as to justify punishing an employee for this type of private speech that routinely takes place at all levels in the workplace."

Antonin Scalia, appointed to the Court by Reagan to replace Burger, wrote in dissent that Myers's questionnaire had far more of a claim to legitimate public interest than McPherson's remark. "Once [she] stopped explicitly criticizing the President's policies and expressed a desire that he be assassinated, she crossed the line." Even if it were a matter of public concern, he continued, the constable had a strong interest, recognized in prior case law, in protecting its public image, in particular since his office was a law enforcement agency.

=== Waters v. Churchill ===
The next case to consider the First Amendment rights of public employees was Waters v. Churchill. In that 1994 case, from the Seventh Circuit, a nurse at an Illinois state hospital charged that her dismissal after remarks she made to a coworker expressing concern about the effect a supervisor's cross-training policies were having on patient care were reported to that supervisor. As in Connick, the speech at issue included personal matters as well as matters of possible public concern. It was distinguished by a dispute of fact between the parties as to the substance of the remark.

O'Connor, writing for a four-justice plurality, held that due to the dispute the Connick test should have been applied to what the supervisor reasonably believed Churchill had said, rather than what a trier of fact might find. Since the former was that she had generally disparaged the supervisor and discussed various personal disputes with her, there was no need to assess whether the statements were, as Churchill had claimed, matters of public concern. Scalia's concurrence, signed by the other three justices, complained that her opinion left open the question of how courts should resolve the question if the employer's belief was found to be unreasonable. "Loose ends are the inevitable consequence of judicial invention," he complained. "We will spend decades trying to improvise the limits of this new First Amendment procedure that is unmentioned in text and unformed by tradition." John Paul Stevens, writing for himself and fellow dissenter Harry Blackmun, likewise found this unnecessary. "The [constitutional] violation does not vanish merely because the firing was based upon a reasonable mistake about what the employee said," he wrote. "A proper regard for that principle requires that, before firing a public employee for her speech, management get its facts straight."

=== San Diego v. Roe ===
In 2004, the Court issued a per curiam opinion in San Diego v. Roe that provided with another opportunity to discuss Connick. It reversed the Ninth Circuit and upheld the firing of a police officer who sold pornographic videos of himself, wearing a generic police uniform, on eBay. The opinion admitted "the boundaries of the public concern test are not well-defined", but found it useful in determining that the officer's pornographic videos were not, as the Ninth Circuit had held, commentary on matters of public concern. "[E]ven under the view expressed by the dissent in Connick from four Members of the Court," it said, "the speech here would not come within the definition of a matter of public concern" since it did not inform the public about the police department's activities. It was "linked to his official status as a police officer, and designed to exploit his employer's image."

=== Garcetti v. Ceballos ===
In 2006, a similar case, in that it involved an assistant district attorney in a large city challenging a nationally known superior over a job action, came before the Court. In Garcetti v. Ceballos, a Los Angeles County prosecutor claimed the office of Gil Garcetti had retaliated against him with a series of adverse personnel moves after he questioned the veracity of a search warrant affidavit following a conversation with a defense attorney, to the point of testifying to them in a hearing. It was initially argued with O'Connor's seat vacant following her retirement, and the justices deadlocked. Following the appointment of Samuel Alito, it was reargued and he cast the deciding vote to reverse the Ninth Circuit and find that Ceballos had not been unduly deprived of his First Amendment rights.

For the majority, Anthony Kennedy found that while Ceballos was speaking on a matter of undeniable public concern, his speech, unlike Myers's or those in the other cases, was made as part of his job duties. Therefore, the First Amendment did not reach it. "Restricting speech that owes its existence to a public employee's professional responsibilities does not infringe any liberties the employee might have enjoyed as a private citizen," Kennedy wrote. "It simply reflects the exercise of employer control over what the employer itself has commissioned or created". He cited language from his majority opinion in Rosenberger v. University of Virginia to the effect that the government has control over all speech it pays for.

David Souter, in one of three dissents, used Connick to indicate one extreme of the continuum of free speech claims, that where no constitutional interest could be found. (Note: Schenck v. Pro-Choice Network of Western New York, 519 U.S. 357 (1997), was his other extreme.) He argued the majority was applying precedents in an overly broad fashion; Ceballos was not being paid for his speech as much for his legal skills. "The only sense in which his position apparently required him to hew to a substantive message was at the relatively abstract point of favoring respect for law and its evenhanded enforcement, subjects that are not at the level of controversy in this case." Stephen Breyer also noted that Ceballos had professional and ethical reasons that could have compelled him to speak as he did, and the Court should have been mindful of that.

=== Application to Fourth Amendment rights of public employees ===
In another case from the 1987 term, White's "common-sense realization that government offices could not function if every employment decision became a constitutional matter" became the guiding principle for evaluating public employees' Fourth Amendment rights during non-criminal administrative investigations. In O'Connor v. Ortega, Sandra Day O'Connor cited that aspect of the holding when she wrote for a four-justice plurality that while public employees did not lose their Fourth Amendment rights by virtue of their employment the government need only meet a reasonable suspicion standard in order to search their desks or belongings to investigate alleged violations of workplace policy. Waters expanded on that with another holding, that the government has a lower standard to uphold in meeting its constitutional obligations when it acts as employer instead of sovereign. Both would be quoted again in 2010, when Ontario v. Quon considered the same issue in holding unanimously that an audit of police pagers which revealed sexually explicit personal messages was legitimately work-related and constitutional.

== Analysis and commentary ==
Two decades later, Strickler still disagreed with the Court. "This had been an easy case for the lower courts and, I think, rightfully so", he told the Freedom Forum. Justice Brennan had been right, he said, "that public employees are more at risk for expressing dissent." He also called its standard "not very workable", due to conflicting opinions from lower courts trying to apply it. Wessel characterized the speech as "petty bickering" and called the Court's ruling "a common-sense approach." Myers's questionnaire "was nearly 100 percent internal".

Brennan's biographer David Marion sees the case as reaffirming two principles behind the justice's majority opinions in New York Times Co. v. United States, the Pentagon Papers case from 1971. That case had also involved, to some extent, the First Amendment rights of government workers in disputes at work. "[His dissent] is fully consistent with [his] generous view of the Court's powers ... and his commitment to the fullest possible degree of freedom of expression and access to information."

Lewis Maltby, founder of the National Work Rights Institute, is highly critical of the decision. He castigated the public-concern requirement as "[something] the Court just made up" in his book Can They Do That?. "Justice White seems to have missed the Catch-22 quality of his rule", he wrote. "You don't need to question management when you agree with them, and you can't question management when you disagree with them because the very act of questioning them could hurt your working relationship." With exceptions like McPherson, he believes this rule has cost too many public employees their jobs. "The sad reality is that freedom of speech is a myth where your employment is concerned, whether you work in the private or the public sector."

When San Diego v. Roe was handed down, two decades later, Tony Mauro worried that its holding could potentially narrow the public-concern test. Writing at the First Amendment Center website, he noted that it suggested that it was not enough for public-employee speech to excite actual public interest to be adjudged worthy of First Amendment protection, but that such public interest must be in something legitimate. "Applying those subjective terms to Officer Roe's videotapes may have been an easy task," he wrote. "But they could prove perilous in future cases involving, for example, supermarket tabloids or gossipy Web sites."

== See also ==
- List of United States Supreme Court cases by the Burger Court
- List of United States Supreme Court cases, volume 461
- List of United States Supreme Court cases involving the First Amendment
