= Mount Healthy High School =

Mt. Healthy Jr/Sr High School
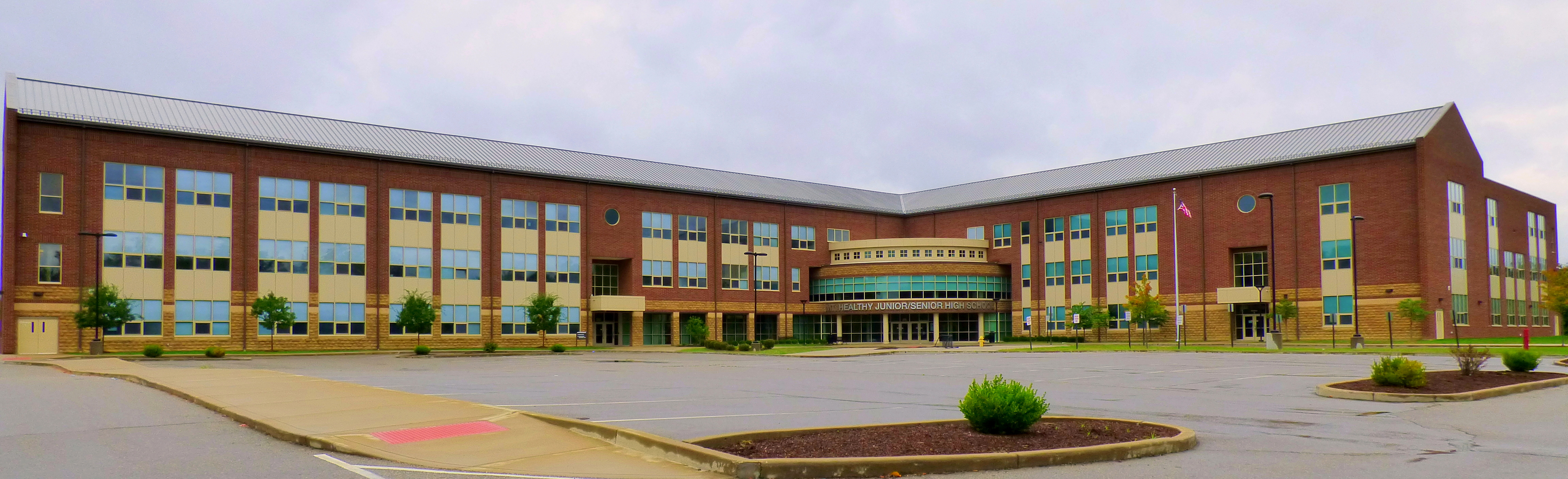

Location
- 8101 Hamilton Avenue; Mount Healthy, Ohio 45231; United States
- Coordinates: 39°14′22″N 84°33′23″W

Information
- Type: Public middle and high school
- School district: Mount Healthy City Schools
- NCES School ID: 390444101346
- Principal: Bob Buchheim
- Teaching staff: 52.00 (on an FTE basis)
- Grades: 7–12
- Enrollment: 842 (2023–2024)
- Student to teacher ratio: 16.19
- Colors: Red and black
- Athletics conference: Southwest Ohio Conference
- Mascot: Owl
- Nickname: Fighting Owls
- Accreditation: North Central Association of Colleges and Schools
- Website: jrsr.mthcs.org

Mt. Healthy Jr/Sr High School is a public middle and high school in Mount Healthy, Ohio, United States outside Cincinnati. It is part of the Mount Healthy City Schools district.

In 2025, the school had about 840 students in grades 9 to 12. About 71 percent of students were African American.

== Notable alumni ==
- David Montgomery, NFL player
- Joel Heath, Former NFL player
- Wayne Davis, Former NFL player
- Bill Doran, Former MLB player
- Lonnie Phelps, NFL player
- Bryan Cook, NFL player
