= Mount Healthy City Schools =

School district in Ohio

Mt. Healthy City Schools

Location
- Mount Healthy and Springfield Township Ohio U.S.

District information
- Type: Public School District
- Motto: "Pride and Progress"
- Grades: pre-K through 12
- Established: 1905
- President: Dr. Julie Turner (School Board President)
- Superintendent: Dr. Sarah Wilson
- Director of education: Jana Wolfe
- Schools: Mt. Healthy Jr./Sr. High School; Mt. Healthy North Elementary; Mt. Healthy South Elementary; Mt. Healthy Early Learning Center
- NCES District ID: 3904441.

Students and staff
- Students: 2,881 students
- District mascot: Owl
- Colors: Red and Black

Other information
- Website: www.mthcs.org

Mt. Healthy City Schools is a public school district in Southwest Ohio. It serves the entire city of Mt. Healthy, Ohio, as well as part of Springfield Township, Ohio.

The District currently operates the Mt. Healthy Early Learning Center for Pre-K and Kindergarten students, Mt. Healthy South and North Elementary Schools, housing grades 1st to 6th, and a junior high/high school campus encompassing grades 7–12, Mt. Healthy Jr./Sr. High School. The Early Learning Center opened in 2021.

== Former school buildings ==
=== Elementary schools ===
- Grace Hunt Elementary (opened 1911, closed c. 1980 - now Mt. Healthy Preparatory and Fitness Academy)
- Ethel Frost Elementary (FALCONS) (opened 1965, closed and demolished 2010)
- Jane Hoop Elementary (HOOTERS) (opened 1953, closed and demolished 2010)
- Matthew Duvall Elementary (DRAGONS) (opened 1956, closed and demolished 2010)
- New Burlington Elementary(1) (sold c. 1950 - now houses New Burlington Church of Christ)
- New Burlington Elementary (BEAVERS)(2) (opened 1961, closed and demolished 2010)
- Lulu Greener Elementary (GIANTS) (opened 1960, closed 2010)
- Rex Ralph Elementary (ROADRUNNERS) (closed July 2011)

=== Pre-schools ===
- Rex Ralph Center (closed July 2011)

=== Middle schools ===
- Mt. Healthy North Junior High School (FIGHTING OWLS) (opened 1967, closed and demolished 2007)
- Mt. Healthy South Junior High School (FIGHTING OWLS) (opened 1975, renamed Mt. Healthy Middle School in 2007, closed and demolished 2011)

=== High schools ===
- Mt. Healthy High School(1) (opened in the 1860s, closed and demolished 1910)
- Mt. Healthy High School(2)

Opened in 1929
Was the Mt. Healthy South Jr. High School from 1962 to 1976
Was the Mt. Healthy Freshman High School from 1976 to 1982
Now the Mt. Healthy City Schools Board of Education

- Mt. Healthy High School(3) (opened 1962, closed and demolished 2011)

==== Former school buildings gallery ====
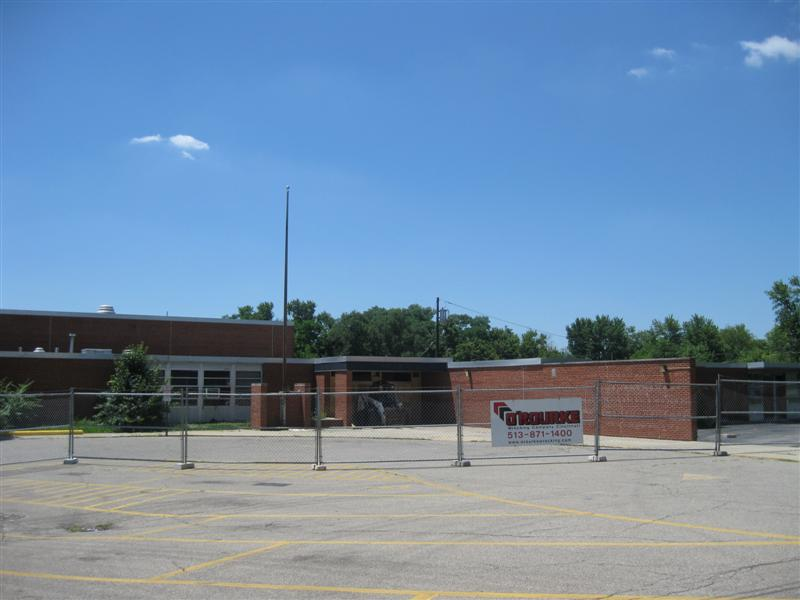
Ethel Frost Elementary

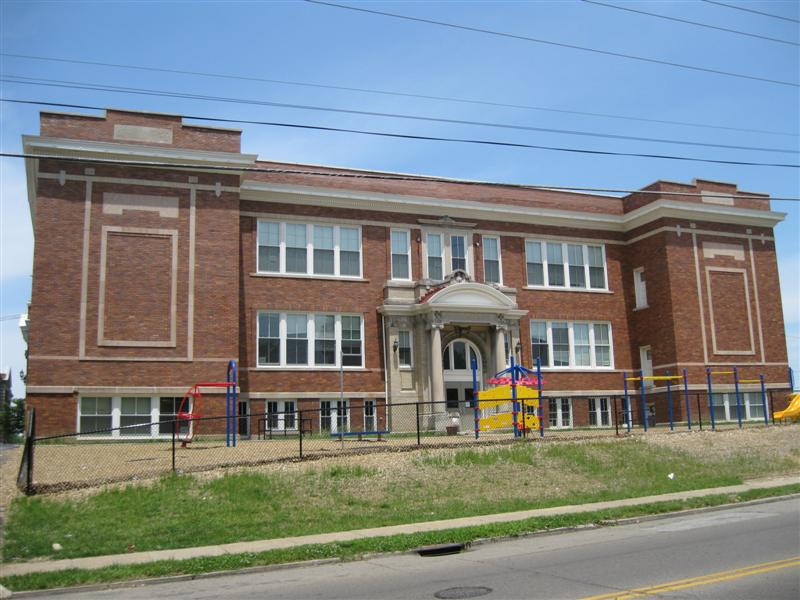
Grace E. Hunt Elementary

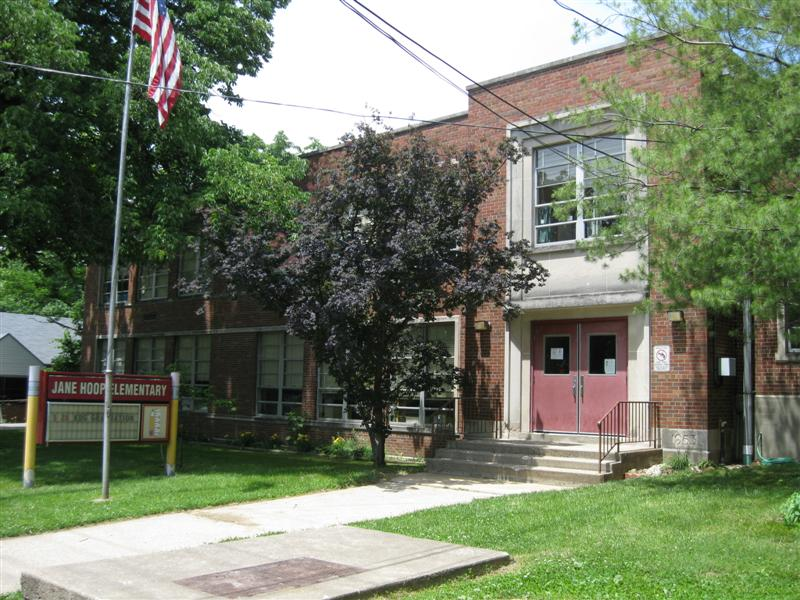
Jane Hoop Elementary

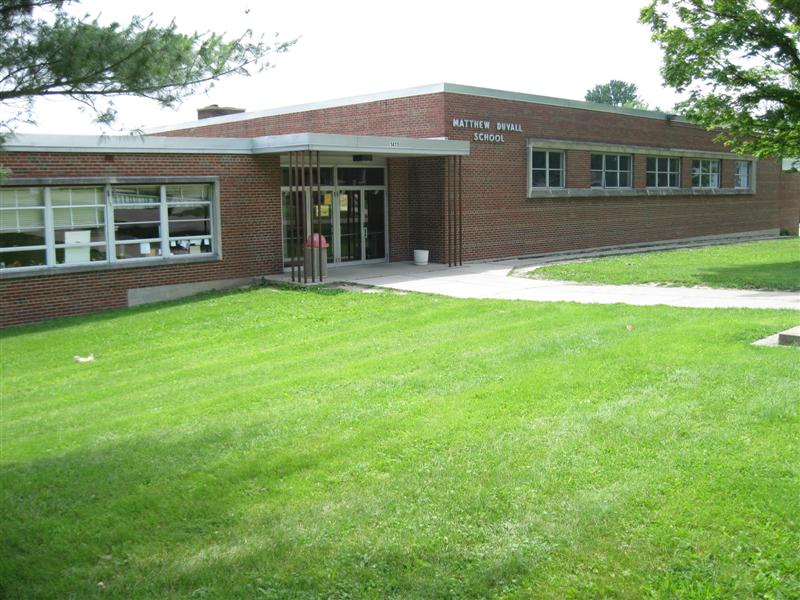
Matthew Duvall Elementary

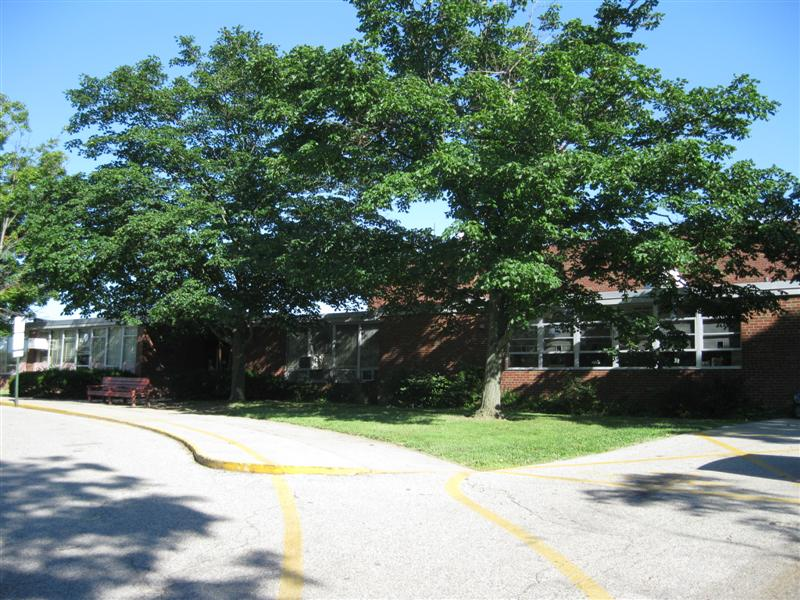
New Burlington #2

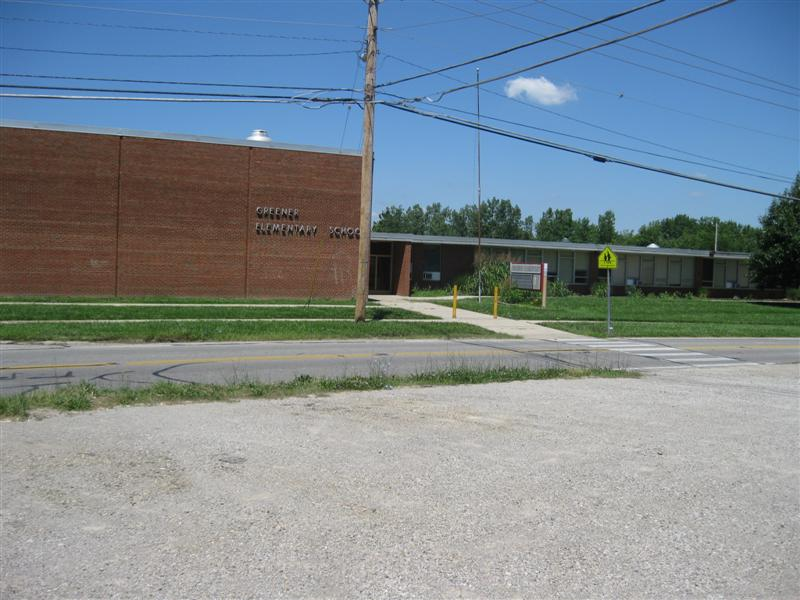
Greener Elementary

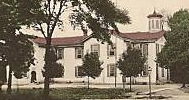
Mt. Healthy High School #1

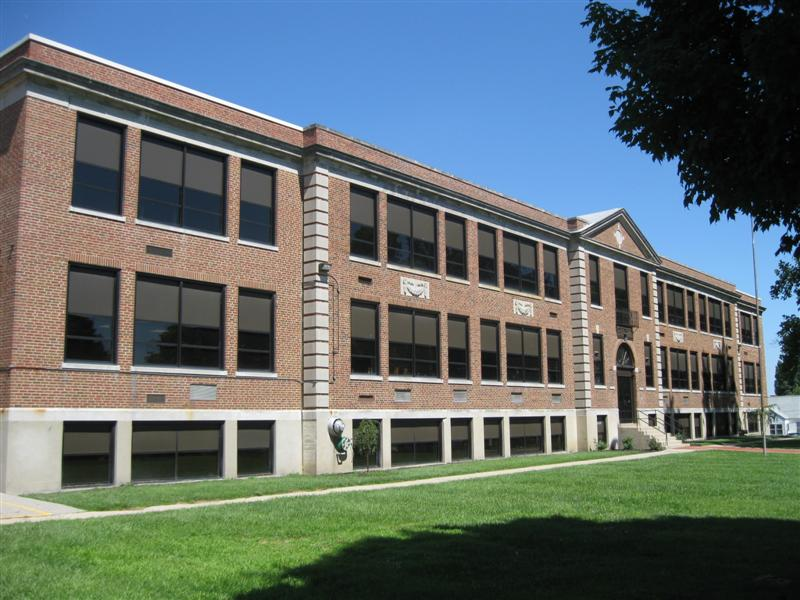
Mt. Healthy High School #2

== Current school buildings ==
=== Elementary schools ===
- Mt. Healthy North Elementary (Opened 2010)
- Mt. Healthy South Elementary (Opened 2010)
- Mt. Healthy Early Learning Center (Opened 2021)

=== Middle schools ===
- Mt. Healthy Junior High School (now a wing of the Mt. Healthy Jr./Sr. High School building)

=== High schools ===
- Mt. Healthy Jr./Sr. High School(4)

== See also ==
- Mt. Healthy City School District Board of Education v. Doyle
