= William Davis Gallagher =

American journalist and poet (1808-1894)

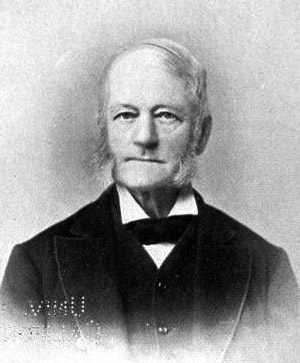
William Davis Gallagher, c. 1891)

William Davis Gallagher (August 21, 1808 – June 27, 1894) was an American journalist and poet.

== Biography ==
Davis was born on August 21, 1808, in Philadelphia, Pennsylvania. He later moved with his family to Mount Healthy, Ohio after the death of his father, a refugee from Ireland who had fled after the Irish Rebellion of 1803. He worked as an editor for various newspapers and in later years became famous for poetry. In 1841, Davis compiled Selections from the Poetical Literature of the West, one of the earliest American regional poetry anthologies; it included poems by 38 writers in the West, including Gallagher's own very popular poem, "Miami Woods". His poetry is available in numerous anthologies. He died in 1894.
