= Mount Healthy Public School =

- Mt. Healthy Public School
- U.S. National Register of Historic Places
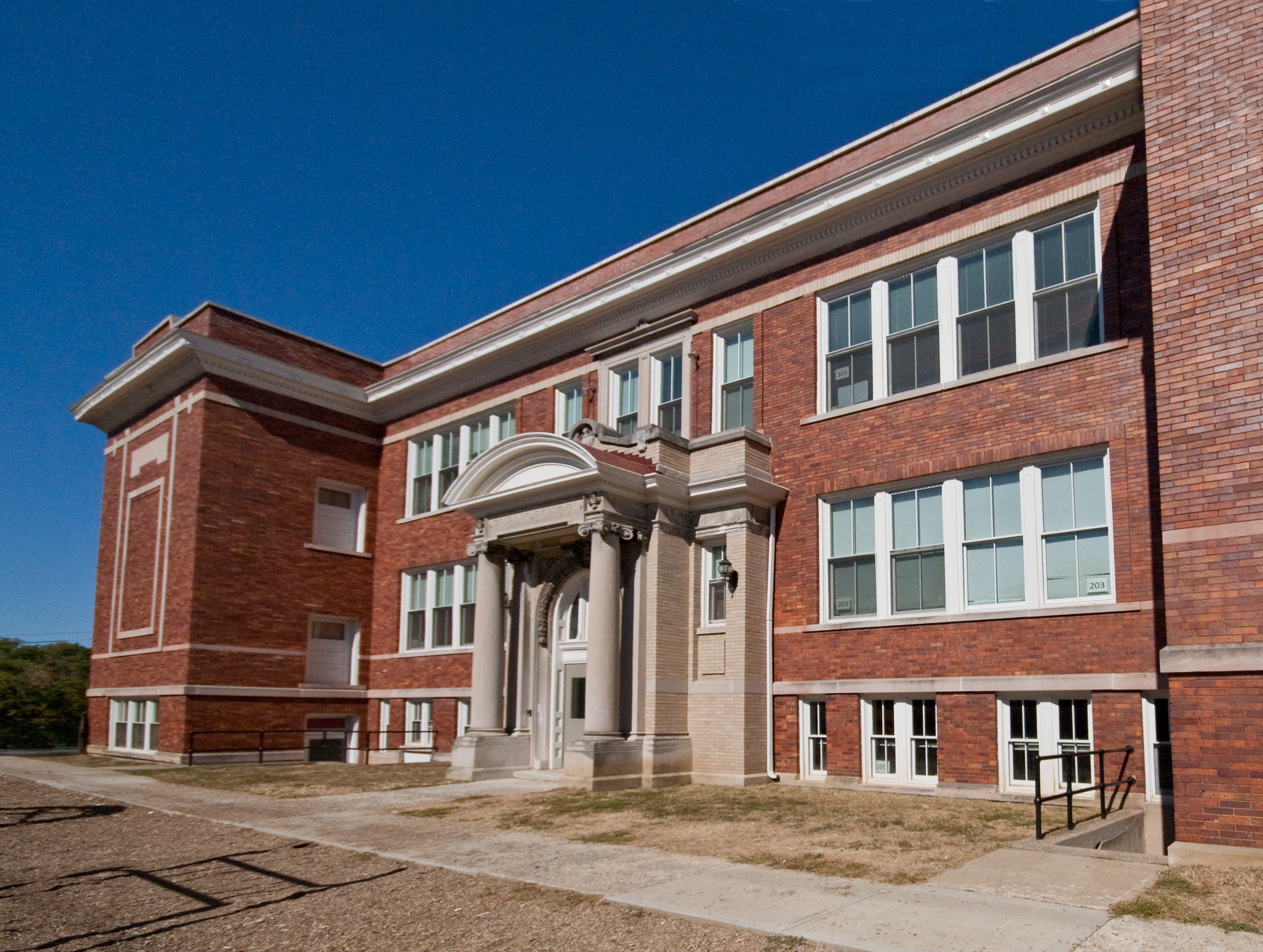

- Location within Ohio Location within the United States
- Location: Mt. Healthy, Ohio
- Coordinates: 39°13′59″N 84°33′00″W
- Architect: John F. Sheblessy
- Architectural style: Late 19th and 20th Century Revivals and Other
- NRHP reference No.: 85000946
- Added to NRHP: May 2, 1985

Mt. Healthy Public School is a registered historic building in Mt. Healthy, Ohio, listed in the National Register on May 2, 1985. The building is located at the corner of Compton Rd. and Harrison Ave. It opened in 1911 and was closed by the Mt Healthy City Schools in the 1980s. The building then underwent a series of acquisitions, and is currently used as the Mt. Healthy Preparatory and Fitness Academy.

== See also ==
- School buildings on the National Register of Historic Places in Ohio

== Images ==
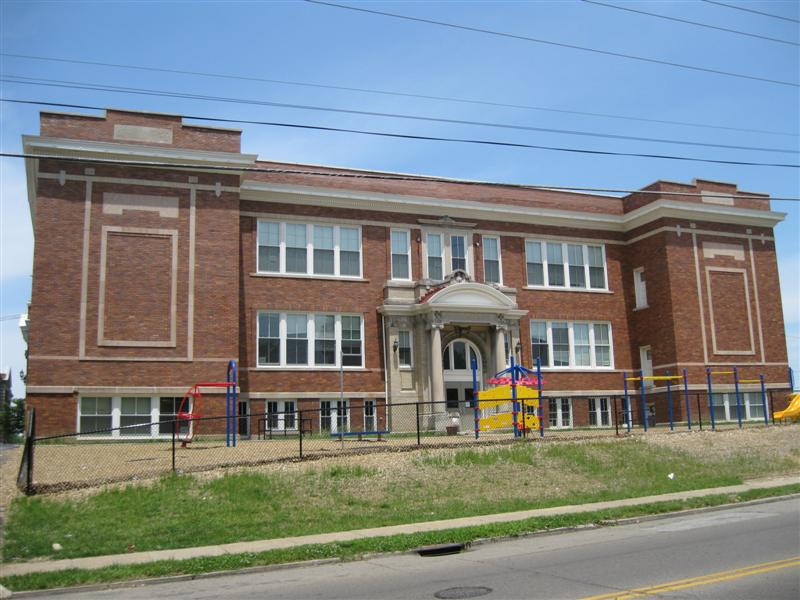
Grace E. Hunt Elementary

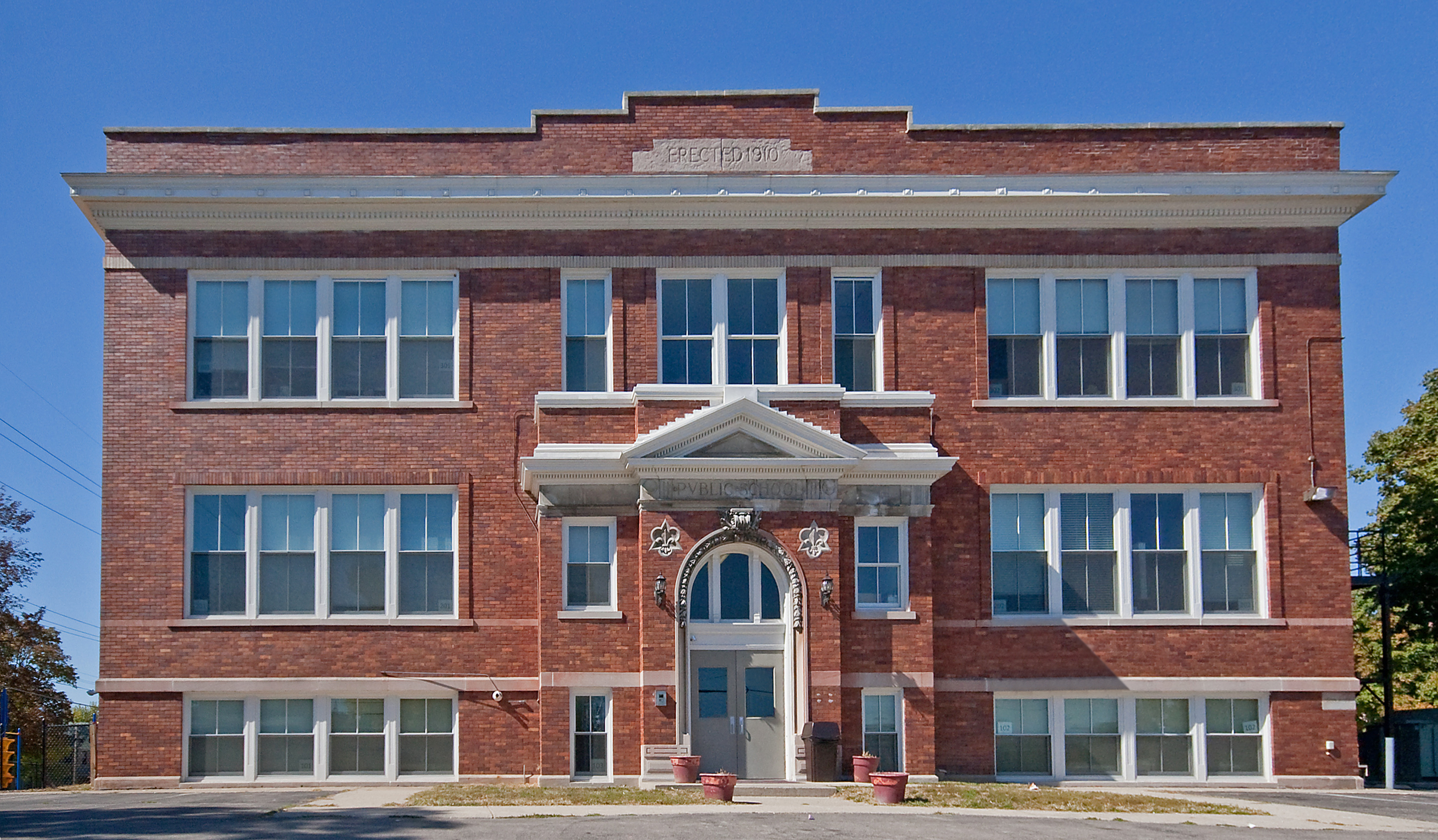
East face of school
