= Joel Heath =

American football player (born 1993)

No. 93
- Position: Defensive end

Personal information
- Born: June 18, 1993 (age 33); Cincinnati, Ohio, U.S.
- Listed height: 6 ft 6 in (1.98 m)
- Listed weight: 300 lb (136 kg)

Career information
- High school: Mount Healthy (Mount Healthy, Ohio)
- College: Michigan State (2011–2015)
- NFL draft: 2016: undrafted

Career history
- Houston Texans (2016–2019); Denver Broncos (2020)*; Detroit Lions (2021)
- * Offseason or practice squad member only

Career NFL statistics
- Total tackles: 34
- Sacks: 3.0
- Stats at Pro Football Reference

Joel Heath (born June 18, 1993) is an American former professional football player who was a defensive end for the Houston Texans of the National Football League (NFL) from 2016 to 2019. He was a three-year starter at Mount Healthy High School in Mount Healthy, Ohio and earned first-team All-State honors twice. He was also named the Associated Press All-Ohio Division II Co-Defensive Player of the Year his senior season in 2010. Heath played college football for the Michigan State Spartans, where he was a three-year letterman. He was named Honorable Mention All-Big Ten Conference his senior year in 2015. He played in 39 games, starting 24, during his college career, recording 60 tackles, 4.5 sacks, two pass breakups, one forced fumble and one fumble recovery. Heath signed with the Texans after going undrafted in the 2016 NFL draft. He played in 32 games, starting 16, for the Texans from 2016 to 2019, totaling 34 tackles and three sacks. He was also a member of the Denver Broncos and Detroit Lions but did not appear in any contests for either team.

== Early life ==
Joel Heath was born on June 18, 1993 in Cincinnati, Ohio. He was a three-year starter at Mount Healthy High School in Mount Healthy, Ohio, where he played defensive end and tight end. He recorded 41 tackles and 6.5 sacks during his junior year in 2009. Heath committed to Michigan State on July 1, 2010. He totaled five sacks throughout his senior season in 2010 and helped Mount Healthy win its first playoff game in school history.

He earned Associated Press (AP) first-team All-Ohio (Division II) honors twice and first-team AP Southwest All-District accolades twice. Heath was named the AP All-Ohio Division II Co-Defensive Player of the Year, AP Southwest All-District Defensive Player of the Year and Fort Ancient Valley Conference Co-Athlete of the Year for his senior season in 2010. He also earned first-team All-Conference honors twice. He was named to the Cincinnati Enquirer’s All-Area (Division II-VI) Team for his junior season.

Heath was part of the Ohio All-Stars team that took part in the June 2011 Big 33 Classic in Hershey, Pennsylvania. He was rated the country's 26th best defensive end in the class of 2011 by Scout.com and Ohio's 49th best senior in the class of 2011 by Rivals.com. He was also named to the All-Midwest Team of both SuperPrep and PrepStar.

== College career ==
Heath played for the Michigan State Spartans of Michigan State University from 2012 to 2015 and was a three-year letterman from 2013 to 2015. He was redshirted in 2011.

He began his Michigan State career as a defensive end, playing in five games in 2012 and a further nine in 2013, recording three quarterback hurries and a pass breakup the latter year. Heath converted to defensive tackle during bowl practices in 2013. He played in 13 games, of which he started all but one, as a defensive tackle in 2014, accumulating 29 tackles and 2.5 sacks while also leading the team's defensive tackles with five tackles for loss. He recorded three tackles, half a sack and a half a tackle for loss in his team's defeat in the January 2015 Cotton Bowl Classic. Heath started 12 games at defensive tackle in 2015, totaling two sacks and 31 tackles, including 5.5 for tackles for loss. He missed one game due to an undisclosed injury and another game due to an ankle injury. He had three tackles in the December 2015 College Football Playoff Semifinal at the Cotton Bowl. He was named Honorable Mention All-Big Ten Conference by the media in 2015.

Heath played in 39 games, and started 24 of them, during his college career. He recorded career totals of 4.5 sacks, two pass breakups, one forced fumble, one fumble recovery, and 60 tackles, including 10.5 tackles for loss. He graduated from Michigan State in December 2015 with a bachelor's degree in interdisciplinary studies in social science.

== Professional career ==
=== Pre-draft ===
Heath was rated the 30th best defensive tackle in the 2016 NFL draft by NFLDraftScout.com. Lance Zierlein of NFL.com said that "Heath has intriguing size that could appeal to defenses running multiple fronts" while also stating that "Heath's lack of pass rush or dominant run stopping tape could hurt his cause on draft weekend."

Pre-draft measurables
Height	Weight	Arm length	Hand span	40-yard dash	10-yard split	20-yard split	20-yard shuttle	Three-cone drill	Vertical jump	Broad jump	Bench press
6 ft 5 1/4 in (1.96 m)	293 lb (133 kg)	34 1/2 in (0.88 m)	10 1/2 in (0.27 m)	5.02 s	1.75 s	2.90 s	4.52 s	7.44 s	33 in (0.84 m)	9 ft 5 in (2.87 m)	26 reps
All values from NFL Combine

=== Houston Texans ===
Heath signed with the Houston Texans in May 2016 after going undrafted in the 2016 draft. He chose the Texans over four other teams that he had received contract offers from. He made his NFL debut on September 22 against the New England Patriots, recording one tackle assist. Heath played in twelve games, of which he started in half of them, and recorded five solo tackles, three tackle assists and two sacks. Both of his sacks came in the Week 17 game against the Tennessee Titans, making him the sixth rookie in Texans history and the first since Whitney Mercilus in 2012 to record two sacks in a game. He also played in both of the team's playoff games, recording two solo tackles in the first game. He suffered a knee injury during the team's second playoff game.

In May 2017, Heath stated his knee was 100 percent healthy. He suffered a hamstring injury later during the offseason. On July 25, he was placed on the active/non-football injury list. On August 23, Heath was activated from the active/non-football injury list. He began the 2017 season as the team's starter at right defensive end and started the team's first four games of the season. He missed Weeks 8 to 10 with a knee injury. Overall, Heath appeared in 13 games, starting nine, for the Texans in 2017, totaling 17 solo tackles, seven assisted tackles, and one sack.

His role diminished in 2018 as he only played in five games for the Texans, making two tackles. He also dealt with knee issues that season.

The Texans waived Heath on August 31, 2019, during final roster cuts. He worked out for seven different NFL teams during the 2019 season but was not signed by any of them. However, he was later re-signed by the Texans on November 11. Heath was waived again on November 21, but re-signed two days later. Overall, he played in two games, starting one, in 2019 but recorded no statistics. He was released by the Texans on December 28.

=== Denver Broncos ===
On December 31, 2019, Heath was claimed off waivers by the Denver Broncos. He was re-signed on March 27, but was later released on July 27. He chose to opt-out of the 2020 NFL season due to the COVID-19 pandemic and was reinstated to the Broncos' roster on their opt-out reserve list on August 25. He was waived after the season on February 2, 2021.

=== Detroit Lions ===
On February 18, 2021, Heath signed with the Detroit Lions. He suffered a season-ending torn ACL during practice on May 26 and was placed on injured reserve on May 28, 2021. On January 4, 2022, he was moved to the team's reserve/COVID-19 list after testing positive for COVID-19. However, he was reinstated on January 10. Heath became a free agent in March 2022.

Heath played in 32 regular season games, starting 16, during his NFL career, totaling 34 tackles and three sacks. He also appeared in two playoff games, recording two solo tackles.

== Personal life ==
In 2017, Heath founded the JH93 Football Camp, an annual youth football camp at his alma mater Mount Healthy High School.
