= Michael Gottesman (lawyer) =

American lawyer

Michael H. Gottesman is a lawyer and law professor at Georgetown University Law Center, specializing in the fields of labor law, constitutional law, and civil rights. He practiced and became a partner with the Washington, D.C., firm Bredhoff and Kaiser from 1961-1988.

After attending the University of Chicago in Chicago, Illinois and Yale Law School in New Haven, Connecticut, Gottesman worked as a Trial Attorney in the U.S. Department of Justice Antitrust Division. He has served as a member of the Judicial Nominating Commission for the District of Columbia; the Executive Board of the Lawyers' Committee for Civil Rights Under Law and its Amicus subcommittee; and the Legal Committee of the American Association of University Professors. He has argued 21 cases in front of the Supreme Court of the United States.

Case	Argued	Decided	Represented
Chamber of Commerce v. Brown, No.06-939	March 19, 2008	June 19, 2008	Respondents
Semtek International Inc. v. Lockheed Martin Corp., 531 U.S. 497	December 5, 2000	February 27, 2001	Petitioner
Board of Trustees of the University of Alabama v. Garrett, 531 U.S. 356	October 11, 2000	February 21, 2001	Respondent
Olmstead v. L.C. ex rel. Zimring, 527 U.S. 581	April 21, 1999	June 22, 1999	Respondents
General Electric Co. v. Joiner, 522 U.S. 136	October 14, 1997	December 15, 1997	Respondents
BMW of North America, Inc. v. Gore, 517 U.S. 559	October 11, 1995	May 20, 1996	Respondent
Freightliner Corp. v. Myrick, 514 U.S. 280	February 22, 1995	April 18, 1995	Respondents
Daubert v. Merrell Dow Pharms., 509 U.S. 579	March 30, 1993	June 28, 1993	Petitioner
Richardson-Merrell, Inc. v. Koller, 472 U.S. 424	February 26, 1985	June 17, 1985	Respondents
Silkwood v. Kerr-McGee Corp., 464 U.S. 238	October 4, 1983	January 11, 1984	Petitioner
United Steelworkers of Am. v. Sadlowski, 457 U.S. 102	March 31, 1982	June 14, 1982	Petitioner
Pullman-Standard, Div. of Pullman v. Swint, 456 U.S. 273	January 19, 1982	April 27, 1982	Petitioners
United Steelworkers v. Weber, 443 U.S. 193	March 28, 1979	June 27, 1979	Petitioner
Mt. Healthy City Sch. Dist. Bd. of Educ. v. Doyle, 429 U.S. 274	November 3, 1976	January 11, 1977	Respondent
Franks v. Bowman Transp. Co., 424 U.S. 747	November 3, 1975	March 24, 1976	Respondent
Dunlop v. Bachowski, 421 U.S. 560	April 21, 1975	June 2, 1975	Respondent
Perry v. Sindermann, 408 U.S. 593	January 18, 1972	June 29, 1972	Respondent
Hodgson v. United Steelworkers of America, 403 U.S. 333	March 23, 1971	June 14, 1971	Respondents
Dyke v. Taylor Implement Mfg. Co., 391 U.S. 216	January 18, 1968	May 20, 1968	Petitioners
Nash v. Florida Industrial Com., 389 U.S. 235	November 9, 1967	December 5, 1967	Petitioner
United Steelworkers of America v. R. H. Bouligny, Inc., 382 U.S. 145	October 21, 1965	November 22, 1965	Petitioner
