= Balancing test =

Judicial test which weighs the importance of multiple factors in a case

In law, a balancing test is any judicial test in which the jurists weigh the importance of multiple factors in a legal case. Proponents of such legal tests argue that they allow a deeper consideration of complex issues than a bright-line rule can allow. But critics say that such tests can be used to justify any conclusion, upon which the judge might arbitrarily decide.

In the United States, many legal issues, which had previously been considered settled by the imposition of bright-line tests through Supreme Court precedents, have been replaced by balancing tests in recent years.

== Referring to evidence ==
When referring to evidence presented at a trial, the balancing test allows the court to exclude relevant evidence if its "probative value is substantially outweighed by a danger of one or more of the following: unfair prejudice, confusing the issues, misleading the jury, undue delay, wasting time, or needlessly presenting cumulative evidence." This means that if a particular piece of evidence is substantially more prejudicial than it is probative, it may not be allowed in as evidence.

== Examples ==
One balancing test from American administrative procedure law applies to the question of due process of law, a consideration arising from the Fifth Amendment and Fourteenth Amendments to the constitution. Due process questions concern what type of procedures are appropriate when the government takes away property or a privilege from an individual; the individual would argue that the government should have, for example, giving them a hearing before taking away their driver's license or cutting off their Social Security benefits. This balancing test weighs such considerations as:

1. Private interest affected by an official action taken by a government agency, official or non-governmental entity (company) acting as a governmental agency. (i.e., how important is the property or privilege that is being withheld or confiscated?)
2. The risk of some deprivation being erroneously inflicted on the respondent through the process used or if no process is used. (i.e., does giving the person a hearing or whatever else they asked for actually make it less likely that the government will make some sort of error by giving the individual an opportunity to point out the government's mistake?)
3. The government's interest in a specific outcome (for example, the government may say that giving a hearing is too expensive).

So, continuing the suspended driver's license example, the judge would have to decide whether the person's interest in keeping their license and increased accuracy that hearings provide outweigh the government's interest in expeditiously and cheaply processing license suspensions.

Another balancing test occurs in the copyright domain when analyzing whether a particular usage of a copyrighted work constitutes "fair use". The World Trade Organization Agreement on Trade-Related Aspects of Intellectual Property Rights (TRIPs) Article 13 allows for uses "which do not conflict with a normal exploitation of the work and do not unreasonably prejudice the legitimate interests of the right holder." This three-part test is also called the Berne three-step test.
