= Mount Healthy, Ohio =

- City
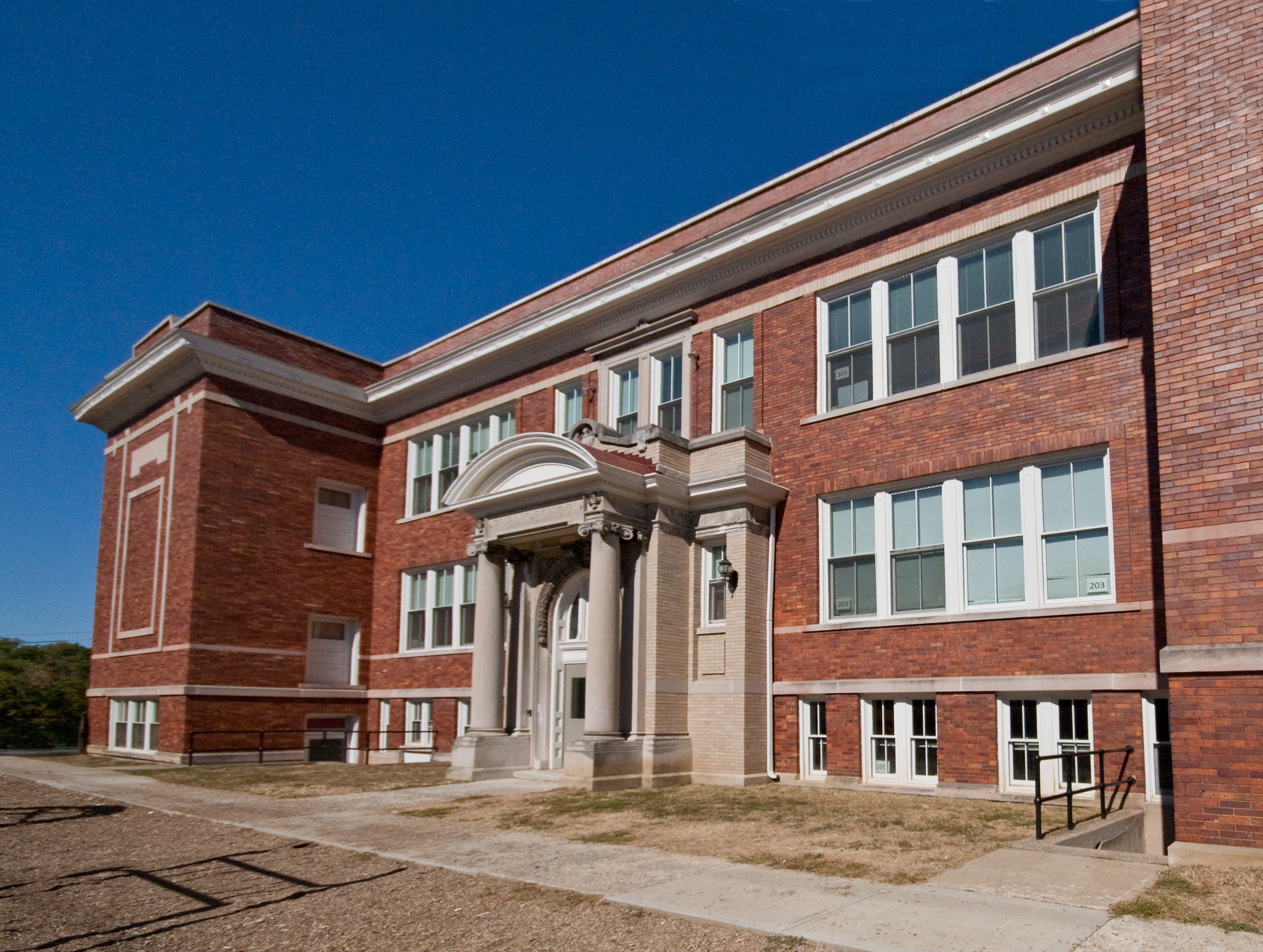
- Mount Healthy Public School

- Flag Logo
- Motto: "A city with a historic past working toward the future"
- Interactive map of Mount Healthy, Ohio
- Location within Ohio Location within the United States
- Coordinates: 39°14′02″N 84°32′48″W
- Country: United States
- State: Ohio
- County: Hamilton
- Founded: 1817 (as Mount Pleasant)

Government
  - Mayor: Jennifer Moody

Area
  - Total: 1.49 sq mi (3.87 km^{2})
  - Land: 1.49 sq mi (3.87 km^{2})
  - Water: 0 sq mi (0.00 km^{2})
- Elevation: 837 ft (255 m)

Population (2020)
  - Total: 6,996
  - Estimate (2022): 6,871
  - Density: 4,678.8/sq mi (1,806.51/km^{2})
- Time zone: UTC-5 (Eastern (EST))
  - Summer (DST): UTC-4 (EDT)
- ZIP code: 45231
- Area code: 513
- FIPS code: 39-52752
- GNIS feature ID: 1086221
- Website: www.mthealthy.org

Mount Healthy is a city in Hamilton County, Ohio, United States. It is a suburb of Cincinnati. The population was 6,996 at the 2020 census.

== History ==
Mount Healthy was founded in 1817 as the village of Mount Pleasant. In 1850, the village renamed itself "Mount Healthy", following a cholera epidemic, in which many of its citizens survived while those in the surrounding territory did not. The village became a city in 1951.

== Geography ==
According to the United States Census Bureau, the city has a total area of 1.41 square miles (3.65 km^{2}), all land.

== Demographics ==
Historical population
Census	Pop.	Note	%±
1900	1,354		—
1910	1,799		32.9%
1920	2,255		25.3%
1930	3,530		56.5%
1940	3,997		13.2%
1950	5,533		38.4%
1960	6,553		18.4%
1970	7,446		13.6%
1980	7,562		1.6%
1990	7,580		0.2%
2000	7,149		−5.7%
2010	6,098		−14.7%
2020	6,996		14.7%
2022 (est.)	6,871		−1.8%

=== 2020 census ===
As of the 2020 census, Mount Healthy had a population of 6,996, a population density of 4,679.60 people per square mile (1,806.51/km^{2}), and 3,390 housing units.

The 2020 census reported a median age of 39.1 years, 24.0% of residents were under the age of 18, 57.4% were 18 to 64, and 18.6% were 65 years of age or older. For every 100 females there were 79.0 males, and for every 100 females age 18 and over there were 74.7 males age 18 and over.

The 2020 census counted 3,102 households, of which 29.2% had children under the age of 18 living in them, 23.8% were married-couple households, 22.9% had a male householder with no spouse or partner present, and 45.8% had a female householder with no spouse or partner present. About 40.2% of all households were made up of individuals and 17.7% had someone living alone who was 65 years of age or older. The average household size was 2.31, and the average family size was 3.14.

Of the 3,390 housing units recorded by the 2020 census, 8.5% were vacant; the homeowner vacancy rate was 2.4% and the rental vacancy rate was 8.1%.

The 2020 census found that 100.0% of residents lived in urban areas and 0.0% lived in rural areas.

Racial composition as of the 2020 census
Race	Number	Percent
White	2,996	42.8%
Black or African American	3,377	48.3%
American Indian and Alaska Native	13	0.2%
Asian	40	0.6%
Native Hawaiian and Other Pacific Islander	0	0.0%
Some other race	188	2.7%
Two or more races	382	5.5%
Hispanic or Latino (of any race)	241	3.4%

According to the U.S. Census American Community Survey, for the period 2016-2020 the estimated median annual income for a household in the city was $41,389, and the median income for a family was $55,158. About 19.6% of the population were living below the poverty line, including 38.5% of those under age 18 and 13.2% of those age 65 or over. About 54.5% of the population were employed, and 16.6% had a bachelor's degree or higher.

=== 2010 census ===
As of the census of 2010, there were 6,098 people, 2,716 households, and 1,454 families living in the city. The population density was 4,324.8 inhabitants per square mile (1,669.8/km^{2}). There were 3,034 housing units at an average density of 2,151.8 per square mile (830.8/km^{2}). The racial makeup of the city was 62.4% White, 33.0% African American, 0.2% Native American, 0.7% Asian, 0.1% Pacific Islander, 0.9% from other races, and 2.6% from two or more races. Hispanic or Latino of any race were 1.9% of the population.

There were 2,716 households, of which 27.7% had children under the age of 18 living with them, 31.4% were married couples living together, 17.2% had a female householder with no husband present, 4.9% had a male householder with no wife present, and 46.5% were non-families. 41.2% of all households were made up of individuals, and 17.5% had someone living alone who was 65 years of age or older. The average household size was 2.17 and the average family size was 2.97.

The median age in the city was 40 years. 22.9% of residents were under the age of 18; 8% were between the ages of 18 and 24; 25.3% were from 25 to 44; 25.8% were from 45 to 64; and 18.2% were 65 years of age or older. The gender makeup of the city was 44.9% male and 55.1% female.

=== 2000 census ===
As of the census of 2000, there were 7,149 people, 3,222 households, and 1,772 families living in the city. The population density was 5,022.2 inhabitants per square mile (1,939.1/km^{2}). There were 3,421 housing units at an average density of 2,403.2 per square mile (927.9/km^{2}). The racial makeup of the city was 73.70% White, 23.32% African American, 0.20% Native American, 0.49% Asian, 0.06% Pacific Islander, 0.60% from other races, and 1.64% from two or more races. Hispanic or Latino of any race were 1.02% of the population.

There were 3,222 households, out of which 28.2% had children under the age of 18 living with them, 36.3% were married couples living together, 15.3% had a female householder with no husband present, and 45.0% were non-families. 40.5% of all households were made up of individuals, and 18.1% had someone living alone who was 65 years of age or older. The average household size was 2.16 and the average family size was 2.93.

In the city the population was spread out, with 24.0% under the age of 18, 8.4% from 18 to 24, 30.4% from 25 to 44, 17.9% from 45 to 64, and 19.3% who were 65 years of age or older. The median age was 37 years. For every 100 females, there were 77.1 males. For every 100 females age 18 and over, there were 71.4 males.

The median income for a household in the city was $32,982, and the median income for a family was $41,753. Males had a median income of $31,783 versus $26,926 for females. The per capita income for the city was $18,662. About 6.8% of families and 8.9% of the population were below the poverty line, including 13.4% of those under age 18 and 11.4% of those age 65 or over.

== Education ==
There are currently three schools within the actual city limits (one square mile): Mt. Healthy South Elementary School, Mt. Healthy North Elementary School, and Mount Healthy Jr./Sr. High School, which are all part of Mount Healthy City Schools. There is also the Mt. Healthy Preparatory and Fitness Academy which is a charter school.

Mount Healthy is served by a branch of the Public Library of Cincinnati and Hamilton County.

== Notable people ==
- Diyral Briggs – professional football linebacker, Green Bay Packers
- Alice Cary – poet
- Phoebe Cary – poet
- Robert S. Duncanson – first internationally known African-American artist
- Suzanne Farrell – American ballerina
- William Davis Gallagher – journalist and poet
- Oliver S. Glisson – Navy rear admiral
- Joel Heath – professional football nose tackle, Denver Broncos
- Paul Helms – baking industry executive and sports philanthropist
- Jeff Hill – professional football wide receiver, Cincinnati Bengals
- Nathaniel Dana Carlile Hodges – librarian
- Dummy Hoy – professional baseball center fielder, Cincinnati Reds
- Pee Wee Hunt – jazz trombonist, vocalist, and bandleader
- William H. MacKenzie – New York state assemblyman
- David Montgomery – professional football running back, Detroit Lions
- Elizabeth Nourse – realist painter
