= Pickering v. Board of Education =

- Supreme Court of the United States

Argued March 27, 1968 Decided June 3, 1968
- Full case name: Pickering v. Board of Education of Township High School District 205, Will County
- Citations: 391 U.S. 563 (more) 88 S. Ct. 1731; 20 L. Ed. 2d 811; 1968 U.S. LEXIS 1471; 1 I.E.R. Cas. (BNA) 8

Case history
- Prior: Dismissal upheld, Will County Circuit Court; affirmed, 225 N.E.2d 1 (Ill. 1967); rehearing denied, Ill. Mar. 27, 1967; probable jurisdiction noted, 389 U.S. 925 (1967).

Holding
- The dismissal of a public school teacher for public statements regarding issues of public importance, without a showing that his statements were knowingly or recklessly false, violated his First Amendment right to free speech. Supreme Court of Illinois reversed and remanded.

Court membership
- Chief Justice Earl Warren Associate Justices Hugo Black · William O. Douglas; John M. Harlan II · William J. Brennan Jr. Potter Stewart · Byron White; Abe Fortas · Thurgood Marshall

Case opinions
- Majority: Marshall, joined by Warren, Harlan, Brennan, Stewart, Fortas
- Concurrence: Douglas, Black
- Concur/dissent: White

Laws applied
- U.S. Const. amend. I

Pickering v. Board of Education, 391 U.S. 563 (1968), was a case in which the Supreme Court of the United States held that in the absence of proof of the teacher knowingly or recklessly making false statements the teacher had a right to speak on issues of public importance without being dismissed from their position. The case was later distinguished by Garcetti v. Ceballos, where the Court held that statements by public employees made pursuant to their employment have no First Amendment protection.

Pickering involved a Township High School teacher who was dismissed after writing a letter to a local newspaper which criticised how the Township Board of Education and the district superintendent had handled past proposals to raise new revenue for the schools. The claim that his writing the letter was protected by the First and Fourteenth Amendments was rejected by the Board of Education. He appealed the Board's action to the Circuit Court of Will County and then to the Supreme Court of Illinois, which both affirmed his dismissal. The Supreme Court of the United States agreed the teacher's First Amendment right to free speech was violated and reversed the decision of the Illinois Supreme Court.

== Background of the case ==
In February 1961 the Township Board of Education asked the voters of Township High School District 205 to approve a bond issue to raise $4,875,000 to erect two new schools, which was defeated. In December 1961, the Board again submitted a bond proposal to the voters for $5,500,000 to build two new schools, which passed and the two schools were built with the money. In May 1964, the Board proposed and submitted to the voters an increase in the tax rate for educational purposes, which was defeated. On September 19, 1964, a second proposal to increase the tax rate was submitted by the Board, and was similarly defeated.

Prior to the vote on the September 1964 tax increase proposal, various newspaper articles appeared in the local paper which were attributed to the District 205 Teachers' Organization. Those articles urged passage of the proposal and stated that failure to pass the increase would result in a decline in the quality of education afforded children in the district's schools. Also, a letter making the same point from the superintendent of schools was published in the paper two days before the election, and copies of the letter were given to the voters the following day.

After the proposal failed, Marvin L. Pickering, a teacher in the District, wrote a letter to the editor in response to the material from the Teachers' Organization and the superintendent. The letter was an attack on the Board's handling of the 1961 bond proposals and its subsequent allocation of financial resources between the schools' educational and athletic programs. It also charged the superintendent of schools with trying to prevent teachers from speaking out against the proposed bond issue. Pickering was dismissed by the Board for writing and publishing the letter.

Under Illinois law, the Board was then required to hold a hearing on the dismissal where it stated that numerous statements in the letter were false and that the publication of the statements:

unjustifiably impugned the "motives, honesty, integrity, truthfulness, responsibility and competence" of both the Board and the school administration. The Board also charged that the false statements damaged the professional reputations of its members and of the school administrators, would be disruptive of faculty discipline, and would tend to foment "controversy, conflict and dissension" among teachers, administrators, the Board of Education, and the residents of the district.

A variety of witnesses testified as to the truth or falsity of the particular statements in the letter with which the Board took issue. The Board found the statements to be false as charged. However, the Board made no further findings or introduced evidence that went beyond the falsity of Pickering's statements.

== Supreme Court ==
The Supreme Court held that the teacher's First Amendment right to free speech was violated and reversed the decision of the Illinois Supreme Court. Justice Thurgood Marshall, writing for the majority, observed that the "problem in any case is to arrive at a balance between the interests of the teacher, as a citizen, in commenting upon matters of public concern and the interest of the State, as an employer, in promoting the efficiency of the public services it performs through its employees."

== See also ==
- Mt. Healthy City School District Board of Education v. Doyle
