= John Shallman =

American political consultant

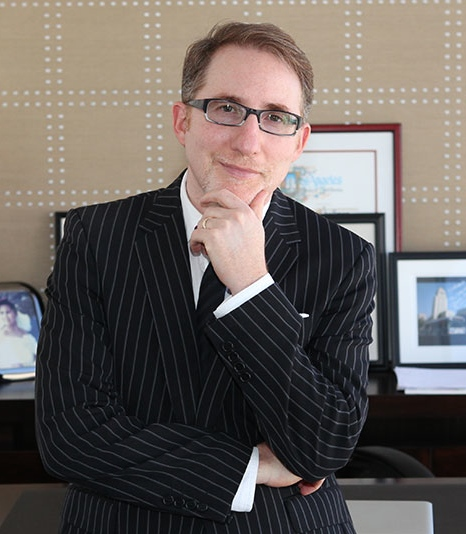
- Born: 1964 (age 61–62); Rock Island, Illinois, U.S.
- Education: University of Iowa; London School of Economics
- Occupations: Political consultant, author
- Website: Official website

John Shallman (born 1964) is an American political consultant and author from Southern California. He is the founder of Shallman Communications and consulted in campaigns at the federal, state, and local level for politicians including Loretta Sanchez, Richard Riordan, and others. He also led the campaign for the successful recall of then judge Aaron Persky after the People v. Turner decision. His 2020 novel Return from Siberia was a national bestseller.

== Early life and education ==
Shallman was born in 1964 in Rock Island, Illinois, where he attended Rock Island High School. As a junior in high school he served as a student member of the school board and led a ballot initiative to fund the school district. Shallman graduated from the University of Iowa and later earned a degree in economics from the London School of Economics.

== Career ==
Shallman is the founder of Shallman Communications, a public affairs and political consulting firm in California. He has consulted for candidates that have resulted in wins for Los Angeles City Council members, Los Angeles Unified School District board members, and various other local and national campaigns.

One of Shallman's first political consulting campaigns was with Mark Takano in 1992 when he ran for the United States House of Representatives. Takano won a seven-candidate Democratic primary before losing to Ken Calvert by 400 votes. He went on to run the campaign for Takano when he was elected to the United States House of Representatives in 2012.

Shallman was also deputy campaign manager for former Los Angeles Mayor Richard Riordan during his win for that position in 1993. The same year, Riordan appointed Shallman to the Los Angeles Transportation Commission, making him the youngest (28 years old) to serve as the president of the commission.

Shallman represented Loretta Sanchez during her victory over incumbent Bob Dornan for the United States House of Representatives in 1996. He also worked with Steve Cooley during his victory for Los Angeles District Attorney over incumbent Gil Garcetti in 2000. Additional campaigns have included Janice Hahn in 2011 and Ro Khanna in 2016. In 2018, Shallman was the campaign manager for the "Recall Judge Persky" movement, sparked by then judge Aaron Persky's lenient sentencing of Brock Turner.

In 2020, Shallman published his debut novel, Return from Siberia. The book is based on true events after he discovered his maternal grandfather's memoir in an attic that he later translated from Yiddish. The book became a national bestseller.

In 2024, he spent almost $20,000 of his own money to oppose LA City Councilwoman Nithya Raman's reelection campaign.
