= 2007 De Anza College rape investigation =

Crime in San Francisco, California, US

The 2007 De Anza rape investigation was a police inquiry into allegations of sexual assault of a minor arising from an off-campus party on March 4, 2007. The investigation focused on eight members of the 2007 De Anza College baseball team. The allegations were investigated by the Santa Clara County, California Sheriff's Office, and reviewed by Santa Clara County District Attorney Dolores Carr. On June 4, 2007, Carr announcted that no charges would be filed. This decision was questioned by many, and the Office of the California Attorney General Jerry Brown was invited by the prosecutor to perform an independent investigation of the available evidence. On May 2, 2008, the Attorney General's office determined that there was insufficient evidence to charge anyone present with a crime.

== Allegations of assault ==
Three members of the De Anza College women's soccer team alleged that, on March 4, 2007, while attending a party off-campus at the home of a member of the college's baseball team, they heard a commotion and knelt to look through an un-screened French door pane. They witnessed an intoxicated 17-year-old girl being sexually assaulted by two or more people. They further stated that a number of other people were in the same room, observing the incident and cheering. They were told to go away, and the door was blocked. The women stated that they intervened, removed the girl and took her to the hospital. It was discovered that she was covered with someone else's vomit.

== Investigation ==
The members of the soccer team reported the incident, and the Santa Clara Sheriff's Office investigated. No arrests were made, even after a second woman came forward to say that she, too, had been sexually assaulted by De Anza College baseball players. The results of the investigation were turned over to the Office of the Santa Clara County District Attorney. The sheriff's office did not investigate the scene until nearly 23 hours after the girl was brought to a hospital. The District Attorney's office conducted additional investigations and presented its evidence to a grand jury. On June 4, 2007, District Attorney Dolores Carr announced that she would not charge anyone involved in the alleged incident with a crime. Carr later explained that to reveal the details of the case that led her to this decision would have a chilling effect on other rape claims.

Santa Clara Sheriff Laurie Smith stated that she believed that a sexual assault did occur. Carr submitted the case to the Office of the State Attorney General for review.

== Public reaction and aftermath ==
The decision not to prosecute was widely questioned. There was negative reaction in the form of public protests, and adverse comments by the county sheriff, a number of newspaper columnists and editorial page writers. Carr invited Jerry Brown, the then California Attorney General, to conduct an independent assessment of the evidence. Brown accepted, and his office commenced an investigation, later releasing its results. It determined there was evidence that a crime had occurred, but there was also insufficient evidence to identify those responsible. The investigation noted that the physical descriptions of the attackers varied so widely that they could not be accurately identified. The victim was characterized as having no memory of the incident after her arrival at the party. The report concluded that these factors made proof beyond a reasonable doubt, as required for a criminal trial, impossible. The report further indicated that widespread intoxication among the party's attendees hampered the accuracy and reliability of their memories of the event. As a result, Carr's office announced that no charges would be filed, and the criminal case was closed.

== ABC News 20/20 episode ==
An ABC News 20/20 episode aired on June 5, 2009, on the 2007 De Anza case. During the episode, April Groelle, Lauren Chief Elk and Lauren Bryeans allege that they witnessed a rape of a teenager by members of the baseball team and stated that if three witnesses aren't enough, 'why is rape even a crime?' Meanwhile, Sheriff Laurie Smith called the case 'frustrating', saying it was possible that the baseball players were sticking to a code of silence. After the episode, one of the baseball players gave an interview about the party.

== Civil case ==
The victim then proceeded to take the case to civil court in February 2011, seeking monetary compensation from her alleged attackers. Defendants Knopf and Chadwick claimed that the sex was consensual. Six other men were also listed in the lawsuit when the trial began in late February, but subsequently settled with the plaintiff or had the lawsuit against them dismissed. In the civil trial, another woman, "Jane Doe II", indicated that she wanted to testify about her own rape by one of the defendants in Jane Doe's case, which took place 10 weeks before the 2007 party. That defendant later settled, but according to the plaintiff's attorneys, a witness came forward placing Chadwick in the room during Jane Doe II's rape. Jane Doe II's case was excluded from the trial, as the court found that there was not enough evidence that Chadwick had planned the attacks. On April 7, 2011, the jury in the civil case found Knopf and Chadwick to be not liable for the allegations against them, so no damages were awarded.

After Judge Aaron Persky's sentencing of Brock Turner in 2016, Persky was criticized by Jane Doe's attorneys for allowing suggestive photos of the unidentified victim, taken at a party a year after the gang rape, into evidence and preventing other victims from testifying. Attorneys for "Jane Doe" said that the photographs were not the only evidence that Persky unfairly permitted. Four of the baseball players had invoked Fifth Amendment rights not to self-incriminate during the discovery phase of the litigation. According to a lawyer for Doe, that was a critical juncture: It prevented the victim's legal team from obtaining evidence that could have helped them pursue their case. The original judge in the case ruled in 2010 that the defendants could refuse to testify, but that would also mean that they would be prohibited from subsequently testifying in the case. That ruling was, however, overturned by Persky after he took over the trial in 2011, a move that Doe's attorneys say undermined her case. Persky was recalled by voters on June 5, 2018, primarily due to his sentencing decision in the People v. Turner rape case.
