= Sexual Assault Nurse Examiner =

Forensic qualification in the US

A Sexual Assault Nurse Examiner (SANE) is a qualification for forensic nurses who have received special training to conduct sexual assault evidentiary exams for rape victims in the United States.

== History of the Sexual Assault Nurse Examiner ==
The program development for SANEs began in the mid-1970s in the United States. The need existed for a more comprehensive sexual assault exam that could produce better patient outcomes.

== What SANEs do ==
Sexual Assault Nurse Examiners are nurses who have received special training to conduct sexual assault evidentiary exams for rape victims in the United States. SANE nurses are specially trained in the medical, psychological, and forensic examination of a sexual assault victim. There are two different credentials available under the SANE designation: SANE-A for adult and adolescent examiners, and SANE-P, which is specifically for pediatric victims.

Not all, but many SANE programs are coordinated by rape crisis centers in place of a hospital. Some programs are employed by law enforcement and conduct their exams at stand alone sites, not in an emergency department (ED). SANEs are on call 24-hours a day and may arrive at the hospital ED within an hour of a sexual assault victim's arrival. Some programs will wait until the patient has had a medical screening exam (MSE) and subsequently have law enforcement bring a stable patient to the sexual assault response team (SART) site for their exam. If the patient is in critical condition and admitted to the hospital, the SANE can perform a 'mobile exam' and bring their exam supplies and camera to the hospital. In addition to the collection of forensic evidence, they also provide access to crisis intervention counseling, STI testing, drug testing if drug-facilitated rape is suspected, and emergency contraception. A SANE will also supply medical referrals for additional medical care or possible follow ups to document how they are healing.

== Training ==
SANE nurses are required to complete at least 40 hours of class or online coursework, and anywhere from 40 to 96 hours of hands on clinical training before being approved to sit for the certification exam. The International Association of Forensic Nursing (IAFN), has set criteria for educators to follow. SANE must have 2 years of RN experience prior to application for the exam. Certification in SANE nursing includes training in forensic examination, including forensic photography, and the use of specialized exam equipment. SANEs also receive training in the screening and treatment of sexually transmitted infections (STIs), pregnancy prophylaxis, and providing testimony in court.

== Sexual Assault Response Team ==
SANEs are often included as part of an interdisciplinary team known as a Sexual Assault Response Team (SART). This is a group of individuals that come together from different areas, such as the medical community, law enforcement, and victim advocacy groups, to help sexual assault victims post assault. Assistance may include forensic evidence collection, legal expertise, and emotional support. Many SARTs also participate in their local communities addressing the prevention of sexual assault and various related issues.

== See also ==
- Rape kit
