= The Paralegal Institute =

Two-year college in Arizona

The Paralegal Institute is a nationally accredited two-year college based in Phoenix, Arizona, United States. The Paralegal Institute (TPI) offers programs specializing in paralegal, criminal justice, medical transcription and legal nurse consultation.

== History ==
The Paralegal Institute was founded in 1974 by John Morrison and is now run by Kathleen Mirabile. It was a paraprofessional residential school until 1979 when it became a distance learning institution. Since then, The Paralegal Institute received accreditation from the Distance Education and Training Council and was approved to grant degrees and diplomas by the State Board for Private Postsecondary Education.

The Paralegal Institute may issue two-year associate degree's in paralegal studies and criminal justice that are recognized by the U.S. Department of Education and Council for Higher Education Accreditation (CHEA). It has been accredited by Distance Education and Training Council since 1979.

== Programs ==
The Paralegal Institute offers six programs in four different areas.

- Paralegal Diploma
  - Students must fulfill 30 credit hours within one year to complete the Paralegal Diploma program. Among this program's specialties are legal research, legal analysis and contracts. Students who complete this program are eligible to sit for the National Association for Legal Assistants Certification Exam.
- Paralegal Associate Degree
  - Students have two years to finish the Paralegal associate degree program, which requires completion of the requirements of a paralegal diploma and five additional specialty courses. These can include programs on torts, environmental law and social security disability.
- Criminal Justice Diploma
  - Students must fulfill 30 credit hours within one year to complete the Criminal Justice Diploma program. Among this program's specialties are criminal law, laws of evidence and other courses taught by licensed practicing attorneys.
- Associate Degree in Criminal Justice
  - To earn an associate degree students must meet the requirements of the Criminal Justice Diploma in addition to five specialty courses. These include programs on white collar crime, corrections and criminology.
- Legal Nurse Consultant
  - This program is offered to individuals who have medical credentials, and offers courses in personal injury law and legal nurse consulting. Students have two years to complete the Legal Nurse Consultant program.
- Medical Transcriptionist
  - The Medical Transcriptionist program teaches students about medical terminology used in hospitals and clinics. Students have two years to complete the Medical Transcriptionist program.
