= Know My Name: A Memoir =

2019 memoir by Chanel Miller

- First edition cover
- Author: Chanel Miller
- Audio read by: Chanel Miller
- Cover artist: Jason Ramirez and Nayon Cho
- Language: English
- Subject: People v. Turner
- Genre: Memoir
- Publisher: Viking Press
- Publication date: September 24, 2019
- Publication place: United States
- Media type: Print (Hardcover)
- Pages: 368
- ISBN: 978-0-7352-2370-7
- OCLC: 1115007919

Know My Name: A Memoir is a 2019 memoir by American author Chanel Miller. In it, Miller writes about her experience being sexually assaulted by then Stanford University athlete Brock Turner in January 2015, as well as the aftermath and subsequent court case People v. Turner.

== Research and writing process ==
In September 2019, Chanel Miller revealed herself as being "Emily Doe" in the People v. Turner case and released her book with the title, Know My Name: A Memoir, on September 24, 2019. She first began work on the book in 2017. The book was an attempt by Miller to reappropriate her narrative identity and describe the trauma she went through, after being referred to in the press as "unconscious intoxicated woman". The author discusses her experience of the assault and the trial, as well as how she has coped since then. Through research for the work, Miller perused court transcripts and testimonies of individuals involved in the court proceedings—materials she had been unable to view throughout the trial of Brock Turner itself.

== Cover art ==
The cover art for the book was inspired by kintsugi, which is the Japanese art of repairing broken pottery with powdered gold, emphasizing the cracks rather than covering them up.

== Publication and sales ==
The book was initially published by Viking Books, through efforts by the publisher's editor-in-chief Andrea Schulz. Schulz took quick action after being contacted by Miller's literary agent, Philippa Brophy. Schulz worked to acquire the rights to the book because of Miller's writing skill and her compelling account. The same month as the book's publication, Miller was interviewed on CBS News program 60 Minutes, where she read from her original victim impact statement.

Know My Name debuted on The New York Times Best Seller list at number five, and also made number 14 on the USA Today Best-Selling Books list. The work additionally made the list of Best-Selling Books in The Wall Street Journal.

== Reception ==
Writing for The Guardian, Rebecca Liu wrote that Know My Name was "unapologetically large", calling Miller's presence "dazzling" and undiminishable. Madison Feller of Elle magazine called it "both an open wound and a salve, a quiet cry and the loudest scream".

U.S. Congresswoman Jackie Speier, who coordinated the June 2016 movement in Congress to openly read the text of Miller's victim statement into the United States House of Representatives, called the book "a powerful example of how we can overcome adversity". Stanford law professor Michele Dauber commented "When people read her book, they will be impressed with her. They will be convinced that Judge Persky and Stanford University behaved very badly." After Miller made the decision to go public with her real name, Stanford University released a statement: "We applaud Ms. Miller's bravery in talking publicly about the ordeal she has experienced and the horrible act that she suffered on our campus. As a university, we are continuing our efforts to prevent and respond effectively to sexual violence, with the ultimate goal of eradicating it from our community."

The book was named one of the top ten books of 2019 by the Washington Post, as well as a top ten book for the American Library Association's Rise: A Feminist Book Project in 2021. It was nominated for Best Memoir & Autobiography at the 2019 Goodreads Choice Awards, and was the winner of the 2019 National Book Critics Circle Award (Autobiography). The San Francisco Public Library selected the book for their 2021 One City One Book program.

== See also ==
Other books by Miller:

- Magnolia Wu Unfolds It All
- The Moon Without Stars
