= Lauren Chief Elk =

Native American feminist educator and writer

Lauren Chief Elk (born 1987) is a Native American feminist educator and writer.

== Biography ==
Lauren Chief Elk was born in San Jose, California, in 1987. She is Assiniboine and Blackfeet from Fort Belknap, Montana, raised in San Francisco, California. She also lived in other parts of the Bay Area and also later in Oregon.

She has worked at San Francisco City Hall, planned SlutWalk and AIDS Walk, and is a legal assistant. She is the co-founder of Save Wiyabi Project and the Media Coordinator of Anonymous' Operation Thunderbird.

She was involved with the 2007 De Anza rape investigation, as one of three women soccer players who interrupted the gang rape. She testified against ten members of the De Anza College men's baseball team, but the criminal case was supposedly dismissed due to insufficient evidence and difficulties in positively identifying the participants. The victim pursued damages against two alleged participants, losing a civil trial presided over by Santa Clara County Superior Court Judge Aaron Persky.

== Save Wiyabi Project ==
She co-founded the Save Wiyabi Project in August 2011 with Jessa Rae, which focuses on serving Native American women who have experienced sexual violence and creating solutions in urban and rural environments. The project was created as a social media campaign to assist in the Violence Against Women Act reauthorization with full tribal provisions.

In an interview with As Us Journal, she said that she is motivated by the progress she has seen in Indian Country on VAWA, especially the people from Indian Country in Montana who have been moved to share their stories and experiences with sexual violence and healing.

With this project they started a "All Nations Rising" VDay movement to highlight indigenous women within the One Billion Rising events.

== #GiveYourMoneyToWomen ==
Chief Elk co-founded the Twitter hashtag #GiveYourMoneyToWomen, which encourages men on Twitter to directly give money to women as a way of balancing gender-based income inequality.

The campaign brought together an on-line community and started a dialog about gender- and race-based unpaid labour. Jennifer Schaffer explains, "Women were banding together to demand payment for all the emotional work we do that goes completely unpaid—the exhausting work of being a tolerant, gentle, nurturing, listening woman in our relationships with men, at all times. Women put up with a lot of bullshit, and we have a science-backed term for it: emotional labor. And as with any kind of labor, women are now ready and eager to get paid."

== Writing ==
She contributed an article to Salon.com in 2014, another to Truthout in 2014, and has posted half a dozen articles on Model View Culture. She was banned from Twitter in December 2016 and has stated that she will rely on Instagram instead. As of July, 2017, Chief Elk-Young Bear was tweeting under the handle @elle_chiefelk. This account was also suspended because the new account violated the Twitter terms of service prohibiting the creation of new accounts to avoid Twitter bans.
