= Cindy Hendrickson =

American lawyer

Cindy Seeley Hendrickson is a judge of the Santa Clara County Superior Court.

Raised in Alexandria, Virginia, Hendrickson went on to earn her bachelor's degree from Stanford University in 1987 and a Juris Doctor from University of California, Los Angeles where she served as the president of a student organization that provided pro bono legal help for the poor. During her time in law school, she served a clerkship for attorney Johnnie L. Cochran Jr. At the conclusion of law school, she then joined Thornton, Taylor, Downs, Becker, Tolson, and Doherty law firm in 1990 as a civil trial attorney.

In 1995, Hendrickson began working for Santa Clara County's District Attorney's Office. During her employment, she acted in supervisory roles at the Palo Alto Courthouse and the District Attorney's Family Violence Unit. During her tenure in the District Attorney's office, she served on its Domestic Violence Death Review Team as well as its Sexual Assault Team. She additionally launched the Santa Clara County Financial Abuse Specialist Team in 1999 serving in the Elder Fraud Unit and chairing the Elder Death Review Team.

In 2011, Hendrickson was named supervising deputy district attorney and subsequently assistant district attorney for the Santa Clara County District Attorney's Office where she worked for 23 years before her election to the Superior Court in 2018. In October 2017, she launched a campaign to replace Judge Aaron Persky. He was recalled due to his controversial sentence in People v. Turner. On June 5, 2018, Hendrickson was elected by voters to serve the four years remaining of Persky's term. Hendrickson has a background specifically in victim advocacy, and has prior experience as a prosecutor. She has also sat on the board of directors for the St. Thomas More Society of Santa Clara County and the St. Vincent de Paul.

Hendrickson is a recipient of the Robert Webb Award for Misdemeanor Trial Advocacy and the Clay Haupert Award for Excellence from the Office of District Attorney of Santa Clara County.

== See also ==
- Santa Clara County Superior Court
