= Forensic nursing =

Application of nursing legal investigations

Forensic nursing is the application of the forensic aspects of healthcare combined with the bio/psycho/social/spiritual education of the registered nurse in the scientific investigation and treatment of trauma and/or death of victims and perpetrators of violence, criminal activity, and traumatic accidents (Lynch, 1991. p. 3) In short, forensic nursing is the care of patients intersecting with the legal system (Speck & Peters et al, 1999). Sexual assault perpetrated against girls and women is a pervasive problem globally and has been associated with a range of adverse mental and physical health outcomes for survivors. This includes post-traumatic stress disorder (PTSD), depression, substance use, anxiety, suicidality, and negative reproductive health outcomes. (Padmanabhanunni & Gqomfa, 2022). Survivors of SA bear the burden of both acute and long-lasting sequelae, including injuries, sexually transmitted diseases, and an increased risk of chronic physical and mental health problems.

Lynch used the clinical forensic medicine (CFM) role as a template for the forensic nurse role. The CFM describes the use of clinical practices to support judicial proceedings to protect a victim, usually after death has occurred. A strong advocate for the forensic nursing specialty in the United States, Virginia Lynch pushed to have the specialty recognized. She was successful in the American Academy of Forensic Science recognition of the forensic nurse in 1989, and she completed her thesis on the conceptual framework for forensic nursing, graduating from arguably the first U.S. forensic nurse master's program. The early publications about the plight of victims spawned nursing programs throughout the United States. In 1992, the term forensic nursing was adopted by nurses gathered at the University of Minnesota who elected Virginia Lynch the first president of the International Association of Forensic Nurses.

The nursing paradigm includes person, health, nursing, and environment. The metaparadigm emphasizes holistic care as it highlights humanistic aspects woven with scientific knowledge. The practice of forensic nursing borrows from all sciences, including legal principles, forensic science, and the bio-psycho-social-spiritual sciences that support the forensic nurse's role in all environments (Volz et al, 2022). The specialty is now recognized worldwide, helping to promote an international focus on violence.

== History ==
Forensic nursing in the United States developed in response to concerns in the 1970s regarding the treatment of patients with crime-related injuries and the proper handling of evidence. Globally, the development of general clinical forensic medicine and forensic nursing have progressed at different speeds, with one preceding the other on a country-by-country basis. Founded in 1992, the International Association of Forensic Nurses is the first professional association for forensic nurses. Other organizations support forensic nurses globally, including End Violence Against Women, International, the American Academy of Forensic Sciences - Forensic Nursing Science Section (2023), and the Academy of Forensic Nursing (2018).

Although forensic nursing can be traced back thousands of years, for recent history, the role in the United States is traceable to the 1970s (Liu, 2024). Medical professionals were involved in court cases that involved crimes, e.g., rape. Medical professionals highlighted the medical issues, moving science from the criminalistic view to a health concern.

== Role and responsibilities ==
Forensic nursing combines nursing practice and forensics in the scientific investigation of death and injury resulting from criminal activity and accidents. In addition to providing care, forensic nurses act as multidisciplinary team members with and consultants to other nursing and medical professionals and law enforcement. They receive advanced training in collecting and preserving evidence, treatment protocols, and legal proceedings and testimony.

The specialized training that forensic nurses receive related to both the medical and legal needs of these patients drives demand for the specialty. Crime victims face a higher risk of post-traumatic stress disorder, depression, suicide, and medical complications than other patients; forensic nurses improve both legal outcomes and quality of life for these patients relative to standard Emergency Department care. Forensic nurses also assist in providing professional insight to potential causes of patient injuries in situations in which witnesses are unavailable.

Prior to beginning an exam, forensic nurses must receive consent from the patient. In addition to documenting obvious injuries, forensic nurses specialize in looking for subtle signs of assault, such as petechiae, voice changes, and loss of bowel or bladder function. Forensic nurses document patient injuries through tools including cameras, measuring tapes, fluid swabs, rape kits, and a high-powered light that can reveal hard-to-see bruises and fluids like semen, urine, or saliva. They document every injury for potential use as evidence in a later court case, where they may be called as an expert witness to testify to the injuries.

Forensic nurses practice nursing with a forensic lens, responding to patients intersecting with legal systems using trauma-informed care and implementing domains of practice, using core competencies unique to nursing and forensic nursing.

=== Forensic Nursing of Populations ===
- Across the lifespan into death
- Maternal child (intimate partner violence, reproductive coercion, prematurity, and others)
- Children (maltreatment, neglect, emotional - physical - sexual abuse, trafficking, and others)
- Adolescents (post-trauma maladaptive behaviors, sexual violence, labor, and sex trafficking, intimate partner violence, technology violence, and others)
- Adults (mental health outcomes from childhood traumas, disabilities, vulnerable adults with developmental challenges, intimate partner violence, and others)
- Older adults (chronic disease outcomes from trauma, mental health outcomes from childhood traumas, financial abuse, maltreatment, disabilities, vulnerable older adults with developmental challenges, intimate partner violence, and others)
- Persons who die (unexpected, youth, violent deaths, and others)

=== Job descriptions ===
- Clinical forensic nurse
- Death Investigator or Nurse coroner
- Forensic nurse with a subspecialty focus, e.g., maltreatment or exploitation across the lifespan (child, adolescent, adult, elder, disabled, interpersonal violence (intimate, domestic, family, community gang, transnational cartels, and others)
- Forensic nurse investigation
- Forensic nurse examiner
- Forensic correctional or institutional nurse
- Forensic Nurse Hospitalist
- Legal nurse consultant
- Nurse attorney

Others noted (and growing) list:

- Forensic Psychiatric Nurses
- SANE Adult/Adolescent
- Correctional Nurses
- SANE Pediatric Nurses
- Interpersonal Violence

The need for nurses with a forensic nurse lens in roles is expanding.

Limited descriptions of roles:

=== Child abuse ===
Child abuse is a common type of trauma that forensic nurses work with.

When these nurses encounter a possible situation involving child abuse they must make sure to protect the child from any more trauma. The forensic nurses look at things such as bruises, possible head injuries and sexual abuse. The importance of a nurse here is key to determine the difference between an inflicted bruise or a usual activity bruise. A forensic nurse will know that a bruise located on the ears, neck and other soft tissues of the body should raise a red flag. Once the physical marks are assessed for abuse or an accident a nurse can decide what to do next, whether that is more tests or a consultation with the physician. When working with children it is important that the nurse makes the child comfortable to ensure a trusting relationship. Forensic Nurses make sure to build this relationship to allow the child to share details they otherwise might keep to themselves. There may be abuse that is not visible to the eye and it is important to make sure the child shares those key details. If abuse is detected the nurse will take the next step of reporting the abuse. Although many policies are similar, each state in the U.S. has its own laws and systems in place for reporting possible child abuse. This is where forensic nursing connects to the legal side of investigation. The nurse must make sure to report their findings, and report them accurately because the nurse is held liable.

=== Sexual assault ===
Another type of trauma that forensic nurses provide care for is sexual assault which includes rape. Forensic nurses are trained to screen for sexual assault because many assaults go unreported. Patients may have some fear, embarrassment, or denial that could inhibit their willingness to report their assault. Trauma-informed questions are essential to these nurses because not all potential victims disclose their experiences. The questions asked need to be worded properly to avoid discomfort and inaccurate information. Recently, there has been an integration of written and verbal questionaries' that may help the patient and the nurse address a possible assault. A possible question to begin would involve asking if the possible victim was forced to do something that he or she did not want to do. It is important that the nurse is able to help a possible victim understand the question without forcing or leading an inaccurate answer. If a patient admits to being sexually assaulted then the next step is to ensure patient safety. There are protocols in place that help a forensic nurse in taking the next step, when a patient admits to being sexually assaulted. For example, the nurse may explain to the victim their legal rights in regard to reporting the assault, as well as the details of the physical exam for evidence. A specialty in forensic nursing is a Sexual Assault Nurse Examiner (SANE). These nurses will collect and record the forensic evidence needed for a criminal case. Some of the evidence included should be a history of the incident, removal of clothing, head-to-toe assessment, urine collection, blood draw, oral swabs, genital exams, and a STD screening. After there has been an evidence collection or not (if the patient does not want the assault reported if over 18) follow-up care is essential. The forensic nurse should be able to provide the victim with necessary resources. These resources may include crisis centers, therapy referrals, and support group information. To add on to that, Sexual Assault Referral Centres (SARCs) act as a point of referral for aftercare, including sexual health services, mental health services, safeguarding, counselling, and drug and alcohol services, accessible through the intervention of Police and SARC’s.

== Certification ==
As of 2015, the International Association of Forensic Nurses offers two professional certifications under its certification body, the Commission for Forensic Nursing Certification (CFNC), for Sexual Assault Nurse Examiners: the Sexual Assault Nurse Examiner - Adult/Adolescent (SANE-A) and the Sexual Assault Nurse Examiner - Pediatric (SANE-P).

In 2018 - 2022, the Forensic Nursing Certification Board (FNCB) completed the Delphi study and qualitative analysis of the variety of forensic nursing roles. The study was the foundation for identifying the common elements in all forensic nursing practices. Using the AACN Essentials template, the FNCB created and offered in 2022 the first Generalist Forensic Nurse certification (GFN-C), and the first examination for the Advanced Forensic Nurse certification (AFN-C). Beginning in 2024, the FNCB offered the Interpersonal Violence and Strangulation Evaluation certification (IVSE-C). Today, countries use the FNCB template to develop graduate programs globally.

== Worldwide ==
=== United States ===
Virginia Lynch, an early advocate of forensic nursing, proposed the creation of the forensic nursing specialty in 1986 and helped establish the first graduate studies program at the University of Texas at Arlington's School of Nursing. The American Academy of Forensic Sciences recognized the forensic nursing specialty in 1991 and the American Nurses Association followed in 1995. Other graduate programs followed.

=== Great Britain ===
In Great Britain, forensic nursing includes a forensic psychiatric nursing sub-specialty, which emphasizes practicing forensic nursing for mental health patients.

=== Canada ===
As of June 2015, forensic nursing is not recognized as a nursing specialty in Canada and does not have a PhD program.

== See also ==
- Psychiatric and mental health nursing
- Forensic Psychology
- Forensic Psychiatry
- Legal nurse consultant
