= Magnolia Wu Unfolds It All =

2024 children's book by Chanel Miller

- Author: Chanel Miller
- Language: English
- Publisher: Philomel Books
- Publication date: 2024
- Publication place: United States
- Pages: 160
- ISBN: 978-0593624524

Magnolia Wu Unfolds It All is a 2024 children's book by Chanel Miller, published by Philomel Books. It is middle grade literature.

Miller, for a long period in her life, had expressed an interest in writing a children's book. The book was published on April 23, 2024. The illustration is black and white.

The main character is a Chinese American, the 9-year-old daughter of laundromat owners; she finds and distributes socks to people looking for them. Vietnamese American girl Iris Lam, Magnolia's friend, helps her. The work is set in New York City. Miller used her time in New York City as inspiration.

Publishers Weekly stated that the book is "endearing". Kirkus Reviews ranked it as one of its "Best Books Of 2024", had a verdict of "GET IT" (obtain the book), and stated that the work is "deeply heartfelt" along with it being humorous and "charming".

In 2025, the book was awarded a Newbery Honor.

== See also ==
- Know My Name: A Memoir
- The Moon Without Stars
