= The Moon Without Stars =

2026 novel by Chanel Miller

The Moon Without Stars is a 2026 novel by Chanel Miller. It is aimed at middle school readers.

The main character, Luna Noon, is mixed race white and Chinese American, and lives in the San Francisco Bay Area. Initially she and her friend Scott Mango, both seventh graders, create magazines to help teenagers with issues, but her friendships change and her behavior changes; she and her new friends create magazines that criticize others and are hurtful to others. Luna realizes that her behavior deteriorated and tries to get back to where she was.

Publishers Weekly stated that "Scott reads as white" (in other words, that his likely racial background would be white).

There is an antagonist named June. According to Betsy Bird of Evanston Public Library, June has "just enough intelligence and sympathy to make her more than just a toxic wastedump of a human."

There is an audiobook version, with Sunny Lu as the narrator.

== Reception ==
Kirkus Reviews stated that the work is "Genuine and poignant".

Publishers Weekly gave the book a starred review.

J. Elizabeth Mills of The Horn Book gave this a starred review. Mills stated that Luna has "a sensitive, authentic voice" and that "the moments of levity and small acts of kindness" will give the audience "comfort".

Bird stated that the book is clearly aimed at middle school readers, but she felt the cover may mislead people into believing it is for elementary school students.

== See also ==
- Middle grade literature

Other books by Miller:

- Know My Name: A Memoir
- Magnolia Wu Unfolds It All
