= Michele Dauber =

Lawyer

- Education: University of Illinois at Chicago; Northwestern University
- Occupation: Academic
- Employer: Stanford Law School

Michele Landis Dauber is the Frederick I. Richman Professor at the Stanford Law School, and a Professor of Sociology, by courtesy.

== Early life ==
Dauber graduated from the University of Illinois at Chicago in 1993. She earned a JD from Northwestern University's Pritzker School of Law in 1998, and a PhD in Sociology from its Graduate School in 2003.

== Career ==
Dauber is the Bernard D. Bergreen Faculty Scholar and Frederick I. Richman Professor at the Stanford Law School, and a Professor of Sociology by courtesy. During the 1998 term, Dauber clerked for Judge Stephen Reinhardt, a progressive icon on the U.S. Court of Appeals for the 9th Circuit. In 2001, she was hired by Stanford Law School. Dauber finished her dissertation, which would become an acclaimed book on the history of U.S. government disaster relief The Sympathetic State: Disaster Relief and the Origins of the American Welfare State. In 2007, she achieved tenure.

She is an activist against campus sexual assault. In 2011, she became co-chair of Stanford's Board on Judicial Affairs. Dauber's committee worked with the provost's office in its years-long revision of the rules. The new process included lowering the burden of proof to a “preponderance of evidence” and providing for an investigator who reported back to a trained five-person panel. The accuser and accused never had to be in the room together. In April 2017, Stanford administrators discouraged her from using a picture of President Donald Trump to illustrate the fliers for a presentation on sexual assault.

Dauber led the petition drive to recall Judge Aaron Persky, the Santa Clara County judge who rendered the verdict in People v. Turner. Dauber, who is a personal friend of Chanel Miller's family, was also involved in disseminating Miller's victim impact speech. In an interview with Amy Goodman of Democracy Now, Dauber said that she had seen the speech before it was made public and sent it out to media outlets with the help of one of the makers of The Hunting Ground, a documentary about sexual assault on campus. In the same interview, Professor Dauber said that Miller had been "gravely injured" by Brock Turner, and gave that as one of the main reasons for the recall. On Valentine's Day in 2018, Dauber received "an envelope containing white powder and a threatening note" with a reference to the Persky case, along with a rape threat. A man was subsequently arrested and charged for this and other crimes, including sending a "glitter bomb" to Dauber. Persky was recalled by county voters on June 5, 2018, with 61.6% voting to recall him.

== Personal life ==
Dauber married her husband Ken in 1997. They reside in Palo Alto, California. Dauber's eldest daughter Amanda died by suicide in 2008.

== Selected works ==
- Landis Dauber, Michele (2013). The sympathetic state : disaster relief and the origins of the American welfare state. Chicago, Illinois: University of Chicago Press. ISBN 9780226923499. OCLC 827242699.
