= Return from Siberia =

2020 novel by John Shallman

- Cover of Return from Siberia
- Author: John Shallman
- Genre: Autobiography; Biography; Fiction
- Publisher: Skyhorse Publishing
- Publication date: August 18, 2020
- Publication place: United States
- Pages: 256
- ISBN: 978-1510763371

Return from Siberia is the 2020 debut novel by American political strategist John Shallman, which was published by Skyhorse Publishing on August 18, 2020. It made the best-seller lists for The Wall Street Journal, USA Today and Publishers Weekly.

The novel, a roman à clef, is split into two alternating narratives: John Simon (i.e. Shallman) and his family discovering a manuscript written by his maternal grandfather Joseph Rakow in present-day California, interspersed with chapters describing Rakow's experiences of experiences of being exiled to Siberia during the final years of the Russian Empire, and his subsequent immigration to the United States. The novel juxtaposes the current day experiences of Simon as a political advisor in the United States with parallels seen in Russian politics 100 years earlier.

== Plot summary ==
The book follows two characters, John from present day Los Angeles, and Joseph Rakow in the Russian Empire. John and his family uncover a manuscript of his grandfather, and learn about his life as it is translated chapter-by-chapter. Joseph, growing up near Pinsk, is exiled due to his political beliefs at age 15, and is sent to live in Siberia for ten years. Upon return, he decides to immigrate to the United States, traveling to Chicago. Taken aback by the poor working conditions of workers in his new home, he dedicates his life to union organizing. He discovers his brother has also moved to the United States, however has taken a radically different path in life to his own. Meanwhile, in the present day, John works as a political consultant for Patti Alvarado, a democrat campaigning in Texas against an incumbent Republican congressman. During the campaign, the congressman attempts to demonize Alvarado due to her history as an undocumented immigrant from Mexico.

== Background ==
The book is based on true events. Shallman discovered his maternal grandfather's memoir in an attic, and had it translated from the original Yiddish. As described in the book, Joseph Rakow grew up near Pinsk in the Russian Empire (now Belarus), and was exiled to Siberia in 1903 at the age of 15. Once he moved to Chicago, Rakow was mentored by American lawyer Clarence Darrow to fight to establish unions. Shallman never met his grandfather.

Though Alvarado's campaign is fictional, Shallman's present day chapters are based on his experience working as a political consultant and crisis management expert, especially the 1996 campaign run of Loretta Sanchez in California.

== Reception ==
Lee Giguere of the Journal Inquirer praised the juxtaposition between the politics of the Russian Empire and modern America as "clever", but felt that the heart of the novel was its "reminder that cruelty and persecution remain entrenched elements of society". In a positive review, Saoirse Hanley of Bookstr believed the novel was "an ode to family...a love letter to freedom and democracy...a story of the incredible endurance of an indomitable spirit", and described it as "an exhilarating read".

Donald H. Harrison of San Diego Jewish World noted the parallels and political comparisons Shallman made between the oppressed underclasses in Czarist Russia with modern racism and exploitation of minorities, however felt that the characters were underdeveloped due to the political focus of the book, as well as the large number of current day characters.
