= Laurie Smith =

28th Sheriff of Santa Clara County, California

28th Sheriff of Santa Clara County
- In office December 15, 1998 – October 31, 2022
- Succeeded by: Bob Jonsen

Assistant Sheriff of Santa Clara County
- In office 1990 – December 15, 1998

Personal details
- Born: June 21, 1952 Lansing, Michigan, USA
- Party: Republican
- Spouse: Brannan Smith
- Children: Shannan Smith
- Occupation: Sheriff of Santa Clara County, California
- Known for: Law Enforcement

Laurie Smith (born June 21, 1952) was the 28th sheriff of Santa Clara County, California, serving from 1998 until her early retirement in 2022, before the end of jury deliberations in her civil trial. She was found guilty of corruption and willful misconduct.

== Early life and education ==
Laurie Smith is a native of Michigan, where she lived until completion of high school. In 1969 she relocated to San Jose, California, for college and to begin her law enforcement career. Smith has a bachelor's degree in Administration of Justice from San Jose State University and a master's degree in Business Management from California State Polytechnic University, Pomona. She is a graduate of the California Command College and of the FBI National Academy and the FBI National Executive Institute.

== Santa Clara County Sheriff's Office ==
=== Deputy Sheriff: 1973–1998 ===
Smith began her career at the Sheriff's Office in 1973, working as a matron (the former title for a female Sheriff's Deputy) at the Santa Clara County Jail until 1976. She then became one of the first female permanent undercover vice cops. In three years in this position, she posed as a prostitute, a vendor of stolen goods, and a drug user. She next worked in the patrol division, then became a watch commander over the jails.

=== Assistant Sheriff: 1990–1998 ===
In 1990, Sheriff Chuck Gillingham promoted her to Assistant Sheriff. (Gillingham was criticized for changing the job description to make a sergeant, her rank at the time, eligible for the post of Assistant Sheriff, as well as promoting Smith and two others over other candidates of higher rank.) In 1992, a male deputy filed an internal complaint against Smith after being transferred out of the narcotics unit while a female deputy with less seniority was allowed to remain. Smith stated that it was not her decision. The same deputy later filed a sexual harassment complaint against Smith, but she was found innocent.

=== Sheriff: 1998–2022 ===
After eight years as Assistant, Smith was elected Sheriff of Santa Clara County in a landslide on November 3, 1998, and took office on December 15, 1998. Though some sources claim she was the first woman sheriff in California, that is incorrect, as Lena Keating was appointed sheriff in Marin County in 1929, and Lucille Brown appointed in Alpine County in 1957. However, it appears Smith was the first woman elected to sheriff in California to be sworn into office; Virginia Black was elected sheriff in Yuba County in June 1998 before Smith, but was sworn in after Smith.

==== 1998–2010 ====
After Santa Clara County District Attorney Dolores Carr made a controversial decision not to prosecute on grounds of insufficient evidence in an alleged rape of a 17-year-old in San Jose in March 2007, Sheriff Smith declared the case "still open" and that she believed a sexual assault did occur. Carr submitted the case to the Office of the State Attorney General for review.

==== Fourth term: 2010–2014 ====
In 2010, Metro Silicon Valley credited Smith with putting the sheriff's office on a sound and efficient basis. She was re-elected in 2010.

A lawsuit in 2011 claimed that Smith issued concealed carry permits preferentially to friends and donors.

In 2012, there was controversy over Smith's assigning a bodyguard to Santa Clara County Supervisor George Shirakawa, Jr., who was ultimately convicted of misuse of funds and other crimes. The bodyguard was a family friend of Shirakawa's, and the bodyguard's brother was a political advisor of Shirakawa. The bodyguard returned to his original job as a county jailer after criticism.

==== Fifth term: 2014–2018 ====
In June 2014 Smith won election for a fifth term against retired Sheriff's Captain Kevin Jensen, who had been endorsed by the Santa Clara County Deputy Sheriffs' Association and the Santa Clara County Correctional Peace Officers' Association.

On August 27, 2015, mentally-ill inmate Michael Tyree was beaten to death by three jail guards who were convicted of second-degree murder in 2017.

Two inmates escaped from custody in San Jose in November 2016. Two inmates escaped from custody in Palo Alto in November 2017.

On June 5, 2018, Smith ran for re-election to her sixth term against five challengers including former undersheriff John Hirokawa and Deputy Joseph LaJeunesse. The results required the first run-off of her career, against Hirokawa, on November 6, 2018; Smith was re-elected.

==== Sixth term: 2018–2022 ====
In 2019, The Mercury News, San Jose Inside, and other publications uncovered evidence that carrying a concealed weapon (CCW) permits may have been issued in a "pay-to-play" fashion to those who donated money to her campaign reelection funds. The Santa Clara County District Attorney opened an investigation and on August 7, 2020, four individuals, including Capt. James Jensen, were indicted by a grand jury. On November 20, 2020, Undersheriff Rick Sung was also indicted. On December 14, 2021, Smith was indicted by a Santa Clara County civil grand jury on seven counts of corruption and misconduct.

On March 10, 2022, Smith announced that she would retire at the end of her term in January 2023. She retired early on October 31, 2022, before the end of jury deliberations in her public corruption trial, and filed a motion to have the charges dropped, which was denied. On November 3, a special civil jury found Smith guilty of all six charges of corruption and willful misconduct, five of which were regarding CCW permits and one relating to the Sheriff's coverup of police misconduct records from an independent investigator.

== Organizations ==
As of 2014, Smith has been on the Salvation Army Board of Directors, a member of Rotary International, a member of the Advisory Board at the University of San Francisco, and a member of the Administration of Justice Program Advisory Board at De Anza College. She is part of the National Sheriffs' Association, and participates in half a dozen regional and international law enforcement groups (in particular she was President of the California State Sheriffs' Association in 2007–08 and is on the President's Council as of 2014) as well as a dozen local groups.
