= Legal nurse consultant =

Health care professional

A legal nurse consultant is a registered nurse who uses expertise as a health care provider and specialized training to consult on medical-related legal cases. Legal nurse consultants assist attorneys in reading medical records and understanding medical terminology and healthcare issues to achieve the best results for their clients. The specialty is a relatively recent one, beginning in the mid-1980s.

A legal nurse consultant bridges gaps in an attorney's knowledge. While the attorney is an expert on legal issues, the legal nurse consultant is an expert on nursing and the health care system. A legal nurse consultant screens cases for merit, assists with discovery, conducts the existing literature and medical research, reviews medical records, identifies standards of care, prepares reports and summaries on the extent of injury or illness, creates demonstrative evidence, and locates or acts as an expert witness. The legal nurse consultant acts as a specialized member of the litigation team whose professional contributions are often critical to achieving a fair and just outcome for all parties.

A legal nurse consultant differs from a paralegal in that a paralegal assists attorneys in the delivery of legal services and frequently requires a legal education, while a legal nurse consultant is first and foremost a practitioner of nursing, and legal education is not necessarily a prerequisite. A legal nurse consultant uses existing expertise as a health care professional to consult and educate clients on specific medical and nursing issues in their cases.

Aside from within law firms, legal nurse consultants may also work for government agencies, insurance companies and health maintenance organizations, in hospitals as part of the risk management department, and may also be in independent practice.

The American Association of Legal Nurse Consultants which was founded in 1989, is a non-profit membership organization whose mission is to promote legal nurse consulting as a nursing speciality. The Association also promulgates a Code of Ethics for the Legal Nurse Consultant practitioner. As of 2001, the Association had approximately 4,000 members, the majority of whom had joined after 1994. As of 2026, the Association membership is estimated between 1,000-1,500 members.

There are a number of training courses and certifications available for legal nurse consultants. The American Legal Nurse Consultant Certification Board offers an online examination which is the only certification exam credited by the American Board of Nursing Specialties. Other training and certification programs are available from both commercial and non-commercial organizations. As of 2001, the American Bar Association sanctioned 28 legal nurse consultant programs across the United States.

== See also ==
- Forensic nursing
