= Aaron Persky =

American attorney and judge

Personal details
- Born: Michael Aaron Persky; 7 March 1962 (age 64) Berkeley, California, U.S.
- Education: Stanford University (BA, MA); University of California, Berkeley (JD)

Michael Aaron Persky (born March 7, 1962) is an American attorney and former judge of the Santa Clara County Superior Court from 2003 to 2018.

In 2016, Persky gained national attention after his ruling in the case People v. Turner, in which he sentenced Stanford University student Brock Turner to six months in jail for the sexual assault and attempted rape of an unconscious 22-year-old woman, Chanel Miller, using the sentence recommended by the Santa Clara County Probation Department. The sentence led to public outrage and was criticized by prosecutors and victims' rights advocates as being influenced by race, gender, and class bias. However, the California Commission on Judicial Performance found that there was not clear and convincing evidence of wrongdoing in their investigation of the case. Nonetheless, in the June 2018 primary elections, voters overwhelmingly recalled Persky, with 61.51% in favor, making Persky the first judge in California to be recalled since 1932.

Prior to joining the bench, he practiced civil litigation for five years and was a prosecutor in Santa Clara County for six years. He also briefly coached girls' tennis at Lynbrook High School in the fall of 2019.

== Early life and education ==
Michael Aaron Persky was born in 1962. His father, Murray Persky, was a psychiatrist. His mother, Susan Elder, was a French teacher. His paternal grandparents owned a poultry business. He grew up in San Francisco, California.

Persky graduated Phi Beta Kappa from Stanford University in 1984 with a bachelor's degree in international relations. He was the captain of the Stanford men's lacrosse team, a club sport. He received a master's degree in international policy studies from Stanford in 1985.

He graduated from the UC Berkeley School of Law (Boalt Hall) in 1990 and was admitted to the bar in California in the same year. After college, he played for the Berkeley club lacrosse team, for which he was also a captain.

== Legal career ==
Persky worked for the law firm of Morrison & Foerster, practicing corporate civil litigation. While in private practice, he received the California Association of Human Relations Organizations' Civil Rights Leadership Award for work on hate crimes, and the State Bar of California's Wiley Manuel Pro Bono Award for his pro bono work for the poor.

In 1997, Persky joined the Santa Clara District Attorney's Office. In this position, he prosecuted criminal offenses which included violent sex crimes and hate crimes. He served on the executive committee of the Support Network for Battered Women and the Santa Clara County Network for a Hate-Free Community.

By 2003, Persky was a deputy district attorney in the Santa Clara District Attorney's Office and prosecuted juvenile offenders; he was also a member of the DA's Juvenile Wards Team.

== Judicial career ==
In 2002, Persky unsuccessfully ran for a seat on the Superior Court of California in Santa Clara County, losing to Ron Del Pozzo, who was also a deputy DA. Persky received 102,801 votes (47.9%), to Del Pozzo's 111,679 votes (52.1%) for Seat 16 on the court. In his 2002 run, Persky was endorsed by the Santa Clara County Bar Association (and its Women Lawyers Committee) and by the San Jose Mercury News, while Del Pozzo received the endorsement of Sheriff Laurie Smith, U.S. Representatives Zoe Lofgren and Mike Honda, and the AFL–CIO. Both candidates ran a positive race.

Persky received an appointment to the court from California Governor Gray Davis the following year.

He is the former Chair of the Court's Community Outreach Committee.

In June 2016, Persky was elected without opposition for another six-year term on the bench. The vast majority of Santa Clara County judges—25 in total—ran unopposed in 2016.

=== Turner sentencing criticism ===
In 2016, Persky received international media attention and widespread criticism for sentencing Brock Allen Turner, a 20-year-old Stanford student convicted of three felony counts of sexual assault, to six months in jail and three years of probation. The statutory maximum sentence was fourteen years; prosecutors sought a six-year term, while the Santa Clara County Probation Department, in its presentence investigation report, recommended a six-month term in county jail, and the defense asked for a four-month term in county jail. During sentencing, Persky said he considered the factors noted by the Probation Office and the "severe impact" of imprisonment on the defendant's life. Following the controversy, the Associated Press analyzed 20 cases where Persky had passed sentences since January 2015 and found that Persky had followed the sentencing recommendation of the probation department every time.

Many legal experts viewed the sentence in the case as unusually light. One juror in the Turner case wrote to Persky that his sentence was "ridiculously lenient" and made a "mockery" of the entire trial. Danny Cevallos, a Pennsylvania-based criminal defense lawyer and CNN legal analyst, said that while the sentence was lenient, Turner's prior clean record made him a candidate for minimum sentencing.

On December 19, 2016, the California Commission on Judicial Performance cleared Persky of any judicial wrongdoing in the Turner sentence.

==== Repercussions to Persky ====
Although he did not face any opposition in an election held five days after the sentencing, Persky lost his seat in a June 5, 2018, recall election. Online petitions calling for Persky to be removed following his lenient sentencing in the Turner case attracted over a million signatures by June 10, 2016. Professor Michele Dauber, a sociologist at the Stanford Law School and longtime advocate on campus sexual assault, who is also a family friend of the victim Chanel Miller, led the committee to Recall Judge Persky. The Committee planned to collect signatures in Santa Clara County to force a November 2017 recall vote. The demands received support from Representative Ted Poe (R-Texas), who took to the floor of the United States House of Representatives to condemn Turner's sentence as too lenient and to call for Persky's removal.

Santa Clara County district attorney Jeff Rosen said "Judicial independence is a critical part of the U.S. justice system. The immense power that comes with judicial independence also comes with accountability to the people we serve." Danny Cevallos stated that judges enjoy a modicum of independence from public pressure, and "there are no apparent grounds for impeachment or allegations of judicial misconduct, based on this sentence alone." Cevallos said that the recall movement "raises the question: is removing judges good for the spirit of the judiciary system, especially when the judge's sole transgression is a legal sentence" where he correctly applied the law. The Santa Clara County Bar Association released a statement saying that removing Persky would be a "threat to judicial independence" and weighs just one of his 13 years of decisions too heavily, saying they see "no credible assertions that in issuing the sentence, Judge Persky violated the law or his ethical obligations or acted in bad faith." Similarly, other sitting judges (both state and federal) and legal commentators defended Persky's decision, noted that the sentence might, in their opinion, be disproportionate due to the lifelong consequences of a criminal conviction and sex offender registration, and called on the bar to protect the independence of the judiciary.

In June 2016, at least ten prospective jurors refused to serve in a misdemeanor trial for possession of stolen property where Persky was presiding, citing the judge's sentencing of Turner as a reason. The following week, Rosen filed a peremptory motion for recusal in a case where Persky was to preside over the criminal trial of a male surgical nurse charged with sexual battery for allegedly touching the genitals and breasts of a female patient under sedation. Rosen called his move to have the judge removed from the case, "a rare and carefully considered step for our office."

As a result of the backlash in the wake of his sentencing of Turner, Persky asked not to hear any more criminal cases, and was reassigned to the Civil Division of the California Court system.

==== Revisit of previous civil case of alleged rape ====
In 2011, Persky presided over a civil lawsuit against multiple members of the De Anza College baseball team, who were accused by the minor plaintiff, "Jane Doe", of gang-raping her while she was unconscious until a passerby intervened. During the trial, Persky decided that the jury should be allowed to view photographs of the plaintiff taken at a party she attended approximately a year after the alleged gang rape, as per the defense's claim that this evidence contradicted the plaintiff's claims of suffering from post-traumatic stress disorder. The jury found the defendants not liable.

Following Turner's sentencing in 2016, the plaintiff's attorneys in the De Anza case criticized Persky for allowing the photos into evidence. Attorneys for Doe said the photographs were not the only evidence that Persky unfairly permitted. Four of the baseball players had invoked Fifth Amendment rights not to self-incriminate during the discovery phase of the litigation. According to a lawyer for Doe, that was a critical juncture: it prevented the plaintiff's legal team from obtaining evidence that could have helped them pursue their case. The original judge in the case ruled in 2010 that the defendants could refuse to testify, but that would also mean that they would be prohibited from subsequently testifying in the case. That ruling was, however, overturned by Persky after he took over the trial in 2011, a move that Doe's attorneys say undermined her case.

== 2018 recall ==
An organization named "Recall Judge Persky" was established seeking to collect the 80,000 signatures of county voters required to hold a special recall election. The organizer of the petition was Stanford law professor Michele Dauber.

The move to recall Persky was opposed by the Santa Clara County public defender, who said she was "alarmed by the hysteria" about the Turner sentence. Rosen, whose office prosecuted Turner and chose not to appeal the sentence, stated, "While I strongly disagree with the sentence that Judge Persky issued in the Brock Turner case, I do not believe he should be removed from his judgeship." At the same time, Rosen's office asked to have Persky removed as the judge in an upcoming sexual assault trial, saying that he had lost confidence that the judge could "fairly participate" in the case. Persky formed a committee to fight the recall effort, called "Retain Judge Persky — No Recall". Persky also initiated a proceeding to enjoin the circulation of the recall petition, which was denied, and Persky's appeal of that denial was also denied.

On January 24, 2018, the county Registrar of Voters confirmed that sufficient signatures had been verified to put the recall on a ballot. There were 94,539 signatures submitted, far more than necessary. The recall issue was on the state elections ballot on June 5, 2018.

At least 93 law professors from public and private universities, including 29 professors from Stanford, signed a letter backing Persky in the recall effort. In addition, the Santa Clara Bar Association issued a statement opposing the recall, saying that it was unaware “of any other complaints or allegations of impropriety against Judge Persky during his 13 years on the bench." He stood by his sentencing, saying he's been unfairly targeted as the "face of rape" by recall advocates, at the same time admitting, "There is an underlying deep frustration among actual victims of sexual assault and women in general about the criminal justice system not taking sexual assault and domestic violence seriously. It's a very genuine and important problem." "The passion is authentic, the end is justified, let's increase sexual assault reporting. Let's do criminal justice reform where it's smart to do so." In a May 18, 2018, interview, Persky stated he had no regrets, and would rule exactly the same again on this case.

On June 5, Persky was recalled by Santa Clara County voters, who supported his removal by a margin of 61.51% to 38.49%. Persky became the first judge to be recalled in California in over 80 years. Two women, Cindy Hendrickson, a Santa Clara County assistant district attorney and Angela Storey, a civil attorney, appeared on the ballot to take Persky's position, should his recall succeed. Storey opposed the recall on principle. When the election results were being tabulated, and they indicated Persky would be recalled, Dauber stated, "The vote today...is a vote against impunity for high-status offenders of domestic violence and sexual violence." Hendrickson won the election to take Persky's place.

In October 2018, Persky was ordered to pay $161,825.68 to Dauber's recall campaign, which Persky had sued.

A 2022 study found that the recall of Persky subsequently led California judges to give more punitive sentencing, which followed pre-existing racial disparities against African American and Hispanic defendants, and predominantly involved non-sexual violent crimes.
