= Chanel Miller =

American author (born 1992)

- Miller at the 2026 National Book Fair
- Born: June 12, 1992 (age 34); Palo Alto, California, U.S.
- Education: University of California, Santa Barbara (BA)
- Occupation: Author
- Writing career
- Language: English
- Period: 2019–present
- Subjects: Autobiographical memoir, children's fiction
- Notable awards: Glamour Woman of the Year (2016); Newbery Honor (2025)
- Website: chanel-miller.com

Chanel Miller
- Simplified Chinese: 张小夏
- Traditional Chinese: 張小夏
Transcriptions
Standard Mandarin
- Hanyu Pinyin: Zhāng Xiǎoxià

Chanel Miller (born June 12, 1992) is an American writer and artist based in San Francisco and New York City. She was known anonymously in People v. Turner as "Emily Doe" after she was sexually assaulted while unconscious on the campus of Stanford University in January 2015 by Brock Allen Turner. The following year, her victim impact statement at his sentencing hearing went viral after it was published online by BuzzFeed, being read 11 million times within four days. Miller was referred to as "Emily Doe" in court documents and media reports until September 2019, when she relinquished her anonymity and released her memoir Know My Name: A Memoir. The book won the 2019 National Book Critics Circle Award for Autobiographies and was named in several national book lists of the year. She is credited with sparking national discussion in the United States about the treatment of sexual assault cases and victims by college campuses and court systems, a topic she addresses as a public speaker.

== Early life and education ==
Chanel Miller was born on June 12, 1992, in Palo Alto, California, the elder of two daughters of a Chinese mother and an American father. Her mother emigrated from China to become a writer and her father is a retired therapist. Miller graduated from Gunn High School in 2010. She attended the University of California, Santa Barbara's College of Creative Studies from which she graduated with a degree in literature in 2014.

== Rape and investigation ==
On the evening of January 17, 2015, Miller accompanied her sister to a Kappa Alpha Order fraternity party at Stanford University. Miller's sister, Tiffany, would later testify at trial that Brock Turner, a man previously unknown to her, had approached her twice and attempted to kiss her, but that she pulled away. The sentencing memo said that Miller's sister was "caught completely off guard" when Turner tried to kiss her and that she alerted a friend after Turner had grabbed her waist. She would later pick him out of a lineup as the "aggressive" man at the party. She also testified that she never saw Turner and Miller interact at the party. According to a police report compiled the morning after the incident, Turner told police that he met Miller outside the fraternity house and left with her. He also stated he did not know her name and "stated that he would not be able to recognize her if he saw her again."

Later that night, two Swedish graduate students, Peter Lars Jonsson and Carl-Fredrik Arndt, were cycling on the Stanford campus at about 1:00 a.m., in the morning of January 18, when they spotted Turner sexually assaulting the unconscious Miller. According to Arndt and Jonsson, the scene did not look right, they surprised Turner behind a dumpster as he was on top of Miller, whose dress had been pulled up to expose her genitals, her underwear and cell phone having been dropped beside her. Jonsson and Arndt saw Turner thrust his hips into Miller, whom the two men observed appeared to be unconscious. Turner told deputies that he was the one who had removed Miller's underwear and digitally penetrated her for about five minutes, though "he denied taking his pants off and said his penis was never exposed." However upon police's arrival, it was noted that Turner had what appeared to be an erection under his pants.

Jonsson testified that he confronted Turner and asked him, "What the fuck are you doing? She's unconscious." According to Jonsson, Turner quickly rose and attempted to flee the scene. As Arndt briefly went to determine whether Miller was breathing, Jonsson chased Turner, tripped him, and held him down around 75 feet (23 m) away from the dumpster, asking "What are you smiling for?" Later at trial, Turner told the district attorney that he had been laughing because he found the situation ridiculous. Arndt then joined the chase, helping to pin Turner down while a third bystander called sheriff's deputies. When the authorities arrived, they arrested Turner on suspicion of attempted rape. According to a deputy sheriff who described Miller as unconscious at the scene, when she arrived at the hospital, she did not respond to shouting and being shaken by the shoulders. She regained consciousness at 4:15 am. She later testified at Turner's trial that at the time she regained consciousness, she had pine needles in her hair and on her body, and dried blood on her hands and elbows. In an interview with police, Miller said she did not recall being alone with a man during the night and that she did not consent to any sexual activity. At the hospital, Miller was found to have abrasions and erythema (reddening) on her skin. One nurse who administered a sexual assault response team examination at the hospital determined that she had experienced significant trauma (physical injury, bruising, etc.) and penetrating trauma (piercing and cutting injuries).

Miller was never formally notified of what occurred to her that night; she found out ten days after the incident through a Stanford article referencing the rape of an unconscious girl which was her.

== Impact statement ==
On March 30, 2016, Turner was found guilty of three felonies: assault with intent to rape an intoxicated woman, sexually penetrating an intoxicated person with a foreign object, and sexually penetrating an unconscious person with a foreign object. On June 3, 2016, the day after Turner was sentenced, a 7,137-word-long victim impact statement by Miller—who was referred to in court documents and media reports as "Emily Doe"—was published by BuzzFeed, and was reprinted in other major news outlets such as The New York Times. It went viral, being read 11 million times in four days after it was published.

In one statement, she detailed the negative effects Turner had on her life: "You took away my worth, my privacy, my energy, my time, my safety, my intimacy, my confidence, my own voice, until today." The statement also detailed the effect on Doe's ability to remain in her full-time job, which she left afterward "because continuing day to day was not possible."

Miller's statement also described her experience at the hospital and learning she was being treated for sexual assault: "The next thing I remember I was in a gurney in a hallway. I had dried blood and bandages on the backs of my hands and elbow...My brain was talking my gut into not collapsing. Because my gut was saying, help me, help me." Doe expresses gratitude to "the intern who made me oatmeal when I woke up at the hospital that morning, to the deputy who waited beside me, to the nurses who calmed me, to the detective who listened to me and never judged me, to my advocates who stood unwaveringly beside me, to my therapist who taught me to find courage in vulnerability."

The statement articulated that "social class" should not be factored into the sentence: "The fact that Brock was a star athlete at a prestigious university should not be seen as an entitlement to leniency, but as an opportunity to send a strong cultural message that sexual assault is against the law regardless of social class." Doe also disagreed with the probation officer's assessment that Turner had shown remorse, stating that Turner had failed to show genuine remorse and this was a factor in her anger at the brief sentence.

On June 15, 2016, a bipartisan group of eighteen members of the House of Representatives took turns reading the statement on the House floor. Representative Jackie Speier organized the reading to raise awareness about sexual assault and to promote her legislation on campus sexual assault. Representative Ann McLane Kuster, Democrat from New Hampshire, said news of the attack led her to identify herself as the victim of sexual assaults and to focus legislative efforts on the problem. Representative Paul Gosar, Republican of Arizona, said: "People need to learn from this...This should matter to everyone." Cheri Bustos said there was a need for more women in the U.S. House to bring the issue of sexual assault to the forefront.

Then–Vice President Joe Biden wrote Doe an open letter titled, "An Open Letter to a Courageous Young Woman," which read in part, "I am filled with furious anger—both that this happened to you and that our culture is still so broken that you were ever put in the position of defending your own worth."

=== Know My Name: A Memoir ===
On August 9, 2019, 60 Minutes released an interview with Miller—who decided to go public with her name. She described her story and the consequences of being anonymous, and met the two students who stopped Turner. Miller's memoir entitled Know My Name: A Memoir was published on September 4, 2019, by Viking Books and became a best-seller. The book won the 2019 National Book Critics Circle Award for Autobiographies, and was named one of the top ten books of the year by The Washington Post. The New York Times also selected Know My Name for its "100 Notable Books of 2019". The Dayton Literary Peace Prize selected the book as its 2020 non-fiction winner.

=== Recognition ===
Miller's account of her assault and the legal case resulting from it "sparked a nationwide discussion about rape on college campuses and how survivors were not being heard", and "became part of the intense debates around rape, sexism and sexual misconduct over the past years", including the Me Too movement.

On November 1, 2016, Glamour named Miller, then known only as Emily Doe, a Woman of the Year for "changing the conversation about sexual assault forever", citing that her impact statement had been read over 11 million times. Miller attended the award ceremony anonymously. She accepted the award on stage in November 2019 after the publication of her book. She delivered a poem at the ceremony in which she advocated for the well-being of sexual assault survivors. She was listed as an influential person in Time's 2019 100 Next list. In 2019, Stanford University installed a plaque on campus memorializing the assault.

== Artwork ==
After her assault, Miller started taking art courses at the recommendation of her therapist. In the summer of 2015, Miller attended a printmaking class at Rhode Island School of Design in Providence, Rhode Island.

When Know My Name was first published, Miller also made a short film about her story, with her artwork and narration. Miller said: "While writing Know My Name, I was constantly drawing as a way of letting my mind breathe, reminding myself that life is playful and imaginative. We all deserve a chance to define ourselves, shape our identities, and tell our stories. ... We should all be creating space for survivors to speak their truths and express themselves freely. When society nourishes instead of blames, books are written, art is made, and the world is a little better for it."

In 2020, a mural drawn by Miller appeared in the Asian Art Museum in San Francisco. The 70 ft-long (21 m) and 13 ft-tall (4.0 m) mural shows three vignettes of a cartoon figure, and the phrases "I was", "I am", and "I will be". The museum was closed to the public due to the COVID-19 pandemic, though the mural is visible through the windows facing Hyde Street.

Miller's 2021 work includes a mural that covers an outdoor dining structure for Alimama Tea and Yin Ji Chang Fen on Bayard Street in Manhattan, New York. The mural was one of nine created in collaboration with A+A+A Studio for their "ASSEMBLY for CHINATOWN" project. The project was conducted to provide aid to family-owned restaurants and members of overlooked communities in Chinatown, New York.

Miller's illustration have also featured as a design on athletic shoes from women's sneaker brand Rykä, a company that advocates for women's rights.

== Writing ==
In 2024, Miller published a middle grade children's book, Magnolia Wu Unfolds It All; it was awarded a Newbery Honor in 2025. Her second middle grade novel, The Moon Without Stars, was one of ten titles selected for the 2026 National Book Award Longlist for Young People's Literature.

== Publications ==
- Know My Name: A Memoir (2019)
- Magnolia Wu Unfolds It All (2024)
- The Moon Without Stars (2026)
