= People v. Turner =

2015 American criminal case

- Court: Superior Court of the State of California in and for the County of Santa Clara
- Full case name: The People of the State of California v. Brock Allen Turner
- Indictment: January 28, 2015, on counts: 1. rape of an intoxicated person, in violation of California Penal Code § 261(a)(3); 2. rape of an unconscious person, in violation of PC § 261(a)(4); 3. sexual penetration of an unconscious person, in violation of PC § 289(d); 4. sexual penetration of an intoxicated person, in violation of PC § 289(e); 5. assault with intent to commit rape, in violation of PC § 220(a)(1)
- Started: March 14, 2016
- Decided: March 30, 2016
- Verdict: Count 1). Withdrawn by prosecution; Count 2). Withdrawn by prosecution; Count 3). Guilty; Count 4). Guilty; Count 5). Guilty
- Defendant: Brock Allen Turner

Outcome
- Turner was sentenced on June 2, 2016, to six months' incarceration in the Santa Clara County jail to be followed by three years of probation. He was released three months early. Additionally, Turner must register as a sex offender for the rest of his life and participate in a sex offender rehabilitation program.

Court membership
- Judge sitting: Aaron Persky

Keywords
- blackout (drug-related amnesia); laws regarding rape

People v. Turner, formally The People of the State of California v. Brock Allen Turner (2015), was a criminal case in which Brock Allen Turner was convicted by jury trial of three counts of felony sexual assault.

On January 18, 2015, on the Stanford University campus, Turner, then a 19-year-old student athlete at Stanford, sexually assaulted 22-year-old Chanel Miller (referred to in court documents as "Emily Doe") while she was unconscious. Two graduate students intervened and held Turner in place until police arrived. Turner was arrested and released the same day after posting $150,000 bail.

Turner was initially indicted on five charges: two for rape, two for felony sexual assault, and one for attempted rape, although the two rape charges were later withdrawn. On February 2, 2015, Turner pleaded not guilty to all of the charges. The trial concluded on March 30, 2016, with Turner convicted of three charges of felony sexual assault. On June 2, 2016, Santa Clara County Superior Court Judge Aaron Persky sentenced Turner to six months in jail followed by three years of probation. Additionally, Turner was obliged to register as a sex offender for life and to complete a rehabilitation program for sex offenders.

On September 2, 2016, Turner was released after serving three months, which was half of his sentence, for good behavior. Turner filed an appeal of his conviction and sentence in 2017, but it was denied.

Chanel Miller's victim impact statement to the court, on June 2, 2016, was widely disseminated by international media outlets. There was also widespread criticism of what was seen as a light sentence given by Judge Persky, and he was recalled by county voters in June 2018. The case influenced the California legislature to require prison terms for rapists whose victims were unconscious, and to include digital penetration in the definition of rape. In September 2019, Miller relinquished her anonymity and released an autobiography entitled Know My Name: A Memoir in which she discusses the assault, trial, and aftermath.

== Background ==
Brock Allen Turner was born August 1, 1995, in Dayton, Ohio. He graduated from Oakwood High School in 2014. At the time of his arrest, Turner was a 19-year-old freshman at Stanford University, enrolled on a swimming scholarship.

Before sentencing, the prosecution filed a memo with the court describing Turner's history of drug and alcohol use at Stanford and earlier in high school. It recounted that police found photos and messages on Turner's cell phone that indicated extensive drug use, including LSD, ecstasy, marijuana extracts, and excessive alcohol. Turner was arrested in 2014 for possession of alcohol while under legal age.

By the conventions of California courts and U.S. media, the woman Turner was convicted of assaulting was called "V01" in the redacted police report on the incident, "Jane Doe" in the indictment, and "Emily Doe" and "Jane Doe 1" by local and regional newspapers, including the San Jose Mercury News, the Stanford Daily and the Palo Alto Weekly. At the time of her assault, Doe was a 22-year-old alumna of a different college.

== The assault ==
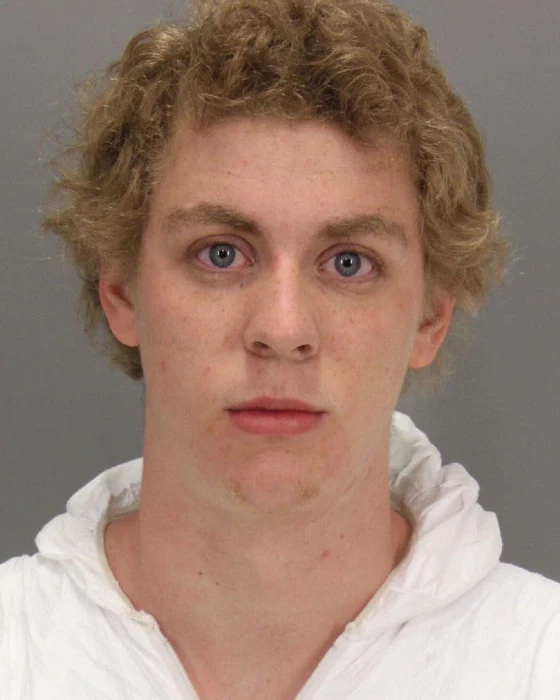
Turner's arrest mug shot

=== Caught in the act ===
Two Swedish graduate students, Peter Lars Jonsson and Carl-Fredrik Arndt, were cycling on the Stanford campus at about 1:00 a.m., on January 18, 2015, when they spotted the assault taking place. According to Arndt and Jonsson, they surprised Turner behind a dumpster as he was on top of an unconscious 22-year-old Chanel Miller, whose dress had been pulled up to expose her genitals, her underwear and cell phone having been dropped beside her. Jonsson and Arndt saw Turner thrust his hips into Miller, whom the two men observed appeared to be unconscious. Jonsson testified that he confronted Turner and asked him, "What the fuck are you doing? She's unconscious." According to Jonsson, Turner quickly rose and attempted to flee the scene. As Arndt briefly went to determine whether she was breathing, Jonsson chased Turner, tripped him and held him down around 75 feet (23 m) away from the dumpster, asking "What are you smiling for?" Later, responding to the assistant District Attorney's questions during the trial, Turner testified that he was laughing because he found the situation ridiculous. Arndt then joined the chase, helping to pin Turner down while a third bystander called sheriff's deputies. When the authorities arrived, they arrested Turner on suspicion of attempted rape.

According to a deputy sheriff who described the victim as unconscious at the scene, when Miller arrived at the hospital, she did not respond to shouting and being shaken by the shoulders. She regained consciousness at 4:15 am. She later testified at Turner's trial that at the time she regained consciousness, she had pine needles in her hair and on her body, and dried blood on her hands and elbows. In an interview with police, she said she did not recall being alone with a man during the night and that she did not consent to any sexual activity. At the hospital, she was found to have abrasions and erythema (reddening) on her skin. One nurse who administered a sexual assault response team examination at the hospital determined that she had experienced significant trauma (physical injury, bruising, etc.) and penetrating trauma (piercing and cutting injuries).

Turner and Miller had attended a party at Kappa Alpha Order fraternity earlier in the night. Her sister testified in the trial that Turner, a man previously unknown to Miller, had approached her twice and attempted to kiss her, but that she pulled away. She also testified that she never saw Turner and her sister together at the party. Miller herself testified that she didn't remember meeting Turner, who was the youngest student at the party, but she did testify that the last thing she remembered from that night was "jok[ing] that undergrad guys would have braces" and "calling myself 'big mama,' because I knew I’d be the oldest one there." According to a police report compiled in the morning after the incident, Turner at first told police that he met Miller outside the fraternity house and left with her. They both also stated they did not know each others' names and that they would not be able to recognize each other if they saw one another again."

After his arrest, Turner told police that he met Miller at the Kappa Alpha house, they "drank beer together," "walked away from the house holding hands," and that he took off her clothes and fondled her while she rubbed his back. Turner then said he got nauseous and told her he needed to vomit. Turner said he got up and started to walk away to throw up, and heard another person saying something to him which he could not understand, then heard the same person talking to another person in a foreign language. Turner initially denied but later admitted that he ran from the two Swedish graduate students before being tackled. During his trial testimony, Turner stated that he and Miller drank beer together, danced and kissed at the party, and agreed to go back to his room. Turner stated that Miller slipped on a slope behind a wooden shed, then Turner got down to the ground and started kissing her. Turner stated he then asked her if she wanted him to "finger" her, to which she said yes. He stated that he "fingered" her for a minute as they were kissing, then they started "dry humping." Turner testified that he stumbled down an incline where he was confronted by Jonsson and Arndt, who were saying things like "You're sick" and "Do you think that's OK?" Turner testified that he did not know what they were talking about. Turner stated that he fled when Jonsson tried to put him in an armlock.

Both prosecuting Attorney Alaleh Kianerci and Miller stated that Turner's narrative during trial testimony was fabricated. Kianerci argued to the jury, "He's able to write the script because she has no memory. But just because he wrote the script doesn't mean that ... knowledgeable jurors have to believe it." The victim described Turner's testimony as presenting "a strange new story, [that] almost sounded like a poorly written young adult novel."

=== Alcohol ===
In his statements, Turner described initially drinking five Rolling Rock beers and two swigs of Fireball whiskey in a friend's room, and then having more beer later, reaching a total of nine drinks.

Both Turner and Miller were tested at the hospital for blood alcohol content. Turner's was estimated to have been 0.171% at 1 a.m. He testified that he did remember what happened that night. Miller's blood alcohol concentration was measured in a hospital several hours after the assault at 0.12%, and doctors estimated her intoxication level at 1 a.m., the estimated time of the assault, to have been around 0.22%, or 0.242–0.249%. She told the police that she did not remember the events from some point after her arrival at the party until she woke up more than three hours later in the hospital. Shortly before 1 a.m., Miller phoned her boyfriend and left a voicemail message, which later would be entered as evidence by the prosecution. The Palo Alto Weekly described it as "almost entirely incomprehensible". A juror later cited it as particularly strong evidence that she was not in a fit state to give consent.

The blood alcohol estimates for Turner and Miller for 1 a.m. were made by a supervising criminalist for Santa Clara County using nominally hypothetical situations.

Turner admitted to only limited prior experience with alcohol as a putative mitigating factor. However, evidence recovered from his cell phone texts recorded in the year before his 2015 arrest showed that he had extensively discussed his use of alcohol. His text messages also revealed use of illegal drugs. In 2014, Turner had been arrested on campus for underage drinking.

=== Consciousness ===
Miller reported that her last memory was around midnight, and that she did not remember telephone calls to her sister and sister's friend made shortly after that. A responding paramedic said she did not respond to a "shake and shout" test, but that she opened her eyes when he pinched her nail beds. When Miller vomited on the scene before being taken away by ambulances, she was able to cough and spit out the vomit on her own without assistance. In a January 19 report, the paramedic rated her as 11 out of 15 on the Glasgow Coma Scale.

=== DNA ===
Santa Clara County criminalist Craig Lee testified that Miller's DNA was found under the fingernails of Turner's left and right hands and on a portion of his right finger. Lee's test did not show when the DNA was deposited and could not tell if it was blood, but he said it did resemble blood. Miller testified that she woke up with dried blood on her hands and elbows.

== Official responses ==
Turner withdrew from Stanford shortly after the incident rather than face disciplinary proceedings. On January 20—two days after his arrest—Stanford announced Turner had been banned from campus. On June 6, shortly after Turner was sentenced, Stanford announced that within two weeks of the incident, it had conducted an internal investigation that led to Turner's being banned from ever setting foot on campus again—the harshest disciplinary sanction it can impose on a student.

Turner had aspirations to swim for the U.S. National Team in the 2016 Olympics, but USA Swimming stated on June 6 that he would not be eligible for membership if he sought to reapply. On June 10, USA Swimming reiterated that it had banned Turner for life under their zero-tolerance policy for sexual misconduct. This decision effectively ended Turner's competitive swimming career. Sanctioned meets in the United States, including the Olympic trials, are open only to members of USA Swimming.

== Indictment and charges ==
On January 28, 2015, Turner was indicted on five charges:

1. rape of an intoxicated person
2. rape of an unconscious person
3. sexual penetration (by a foreign object) of an unconscious woman
4. sexual penetration (by a foreign object) of an intoxicated woman
5. assault with intent to commit rape

These were summarized as "two counts of rape, two counts of penetration and one count of assault with intent to rape". The two formal charges of rape under California state law were dropped at a preliminary hearing on October 7, 2015, after DNA testing revealed no genetic evidence of genital-to-genital contact. On March 7, 2016, the People filed motions in limine and witness list, which outlined permissible evidence guidelines for the trial. The trial began on March 14, 2016.

== Conviction and sentencing ==
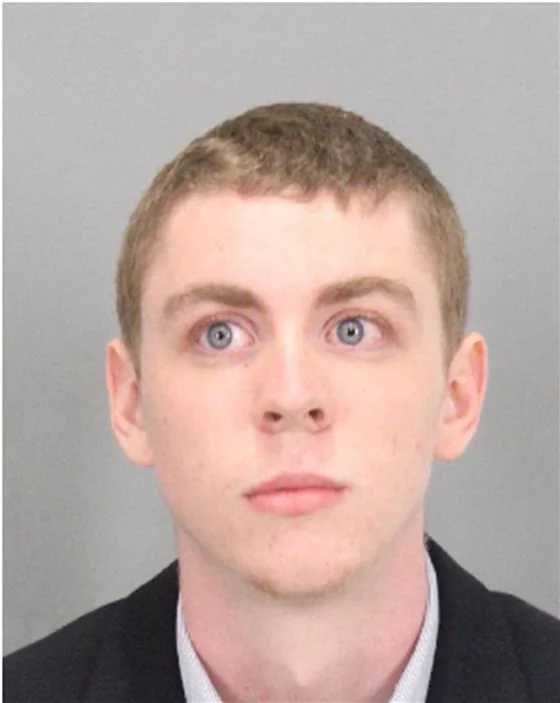
Turner's sentencing mug shot

On March 30, 2016, Turner was found guilty of three felonies: assault with intent to rape an intoxicated woman, sexually penetrating an intoxicated person with a foreign object, and sexually penetrating an unconscious person with a foreign object.

Prosecutors recommended that Turner be given a six-year prison sentence based on the purposefulness of the action, the effort to hide this activity, and Miller's intoxicated state. Santa Clara County probation officials, including his probation officer Monica Lassettre, recommended that Turner receive a "moderate" county jail sentence with formal probation based on Turner's lack of criminal history, youth, and expression of remorse. The probation report did not mention another woman who said she had been upset by Turner's unwanted physical advances at a Kappa Alpha party eight days before the charged offense. This report was present in the trial record.

On June 2, 2016, Judge Aaron Persky sentenced Turner to six months in the Santa Clara County jail followed by three years of probation. After three months in jail, Turner was released on September 2, 2016. He is permanently registered as a sex offender and was obligated to participate in a sex offender rehabilitation program.

== Reaction ==
=== Controversy over sentence ===
Prosecutors and victims' rights advocates criticized Persky's sentencing as lenient and biased. Persky himself had been a student and lacrosse team captain at Stanford University.

Nancy Brewer, a retired Santa Clara County assistant public defender, described Persky as being respected by both prosecutors and defenders, stating that he was seen as a fair judge who is not soft on crime or a judge who would give lenient sentences. Brewer said that Persky had carefully evaluated the evidence and gave what he thought was a fair and appropriate sentence in the case based on the Santa Clara County Probation Department's pre-sentence investigation report. Attorney and media legal analyst Danny Cevallos said: "[the judge] absolutely is obliged to consider very seriously the [probation department] report" and noted that the California penal code allows a judge to depart from the statutory minimum (two years) after considering the defendant's lack of criminal history and the effect of incarceration. Cevallos believed that while the sentence was lenient, Turner's prior clean record made him a candidate for minimum sentencing.

Deputy Public Defender Sajid Khan did not consider the sentence lenient and noted "Turner will register as a sex offender for life, and if he violates his probation he could go to prison for 14 years." Khan further stated that "Persky's reputation among public defenders (a group closely attuned to racial inequities in the courtroom) is that of a fair-minded jurist," saying, "No one has been able to cite an example so far of him where a similarly situated minority client has been treated harshly by him. We appreciated ... the judge's understanding of Brock Turner's humanity ... and we would want any judge to do the same for our clients." Similarly, other sitting judges (both state and federal) and legal commentators have defended Persky's decision, noting that the sentence may, in their opinion, be disproportionate due to the lifelong consequences of a criminal conviction and sex offender registration, and called on the State Bar of California to protect the independence of the judiciary.

Turner's father protested the prison sentence requested by the prosecutor, saying "[The sentence] is a steep price to pay for 20 minutes of action out of his 20 plus years of life." Santa Clara County District Attorney Jeffrey F. Rosen criticized the letter from Turner's father to the court, saying it reduced a brutal sexual assault to "20 minutes of action."

=== Repercussions for the judge ===
==== Persky recalled ====
Although he did not face any opposition in an election held five days after the sentencing, Persky faced a campaign to recall him. Online petitions calling for Persky to be removed attracted over a million signatures by June 10, 2016. Professor Michele Dauber, of the Stanford Law School and longtime advocate on campus sexual assault, led the Committee to Recall Judge Persky. The Committee planned to collect signatures in Santa Clara County to force a November 2017 recall vote. A request for an injunction by Persky delayed that initiative. The California Attorney General's office supported the propriety of the approval of the petition by the county registrar of voters to allow the recall to go forward. Persky's legal team argued that since he was a state officer, only the California Secretary of State had the authority to approve its acceptance. The recall vote required gathering 90,000 verified signatures. Persky paid $30,000 to the firm of Brian Seitchik to lead the opposition to the recall. A retired judge living in Santa Cruz heard Persky's request for injunction to prevent the recall election and approved it. The demands for recall received support from Representative Ted Poe (R-Texas), who spoke in the United States House of Representatives to condemn Turner's sentence as too lenient and to call for Persky's removal.

The move to recall Persky was opposed by the Santa Clara County public defender, who said she was "alarmed by the hysteria" about the Turner sentence. A group of 70 public defenders petitioned in support of Persky, warning against "mass incarceration" brought upon by state legislatures or indiscreet judges, and fearing that the backlash against Persky could hurt their clients (mostly poor Black and Latino Americans) by compelling judges to give out harsh sentences. Deputy Public Defender Sajid Khan wrote "rather than using robotic, one size fits all punishment schemes, we want judges, like Judge Persky, to engage in thoughtful, case by case, individualized determinations of the appropriate sentence for a particular crime and particular offender." Santa Clara County district attorney Jeff Rosen, whose office prosecuted Turner and did not appeal the sentence, stated, "While I strongly disagree with the sentence that Judge Persky issued in the Brock Turner case, I do not believe he should be removed from his judgeship," adding, "Judicial independence is a critical part of the U.S. justice system. The immense power that comes with judicial independence also comes with accountability to the people we serve."

Danny Cevallos stated that judges enjoy a modicum of independence from public pressure and "there are no apparent grounds for impeachment or allegations of judicial misconduct, based on this sentence alone." Cevallos said that the recall movement "raises the question: is removing judges good for the spirit of the judiciary system, especially when the judge's sole transgression is a legal sentence" where he correctly applied the law. The Santa Clara County Bar Association released a statement saying that removing Persky would be a "threat to judicial independence" and weighs just one of his 13 years of decisions too heavily, saying they see "no credible assertions that in issuing the sentence, Judge Persky violated the law or his ethical obligations or acted in bad faith." Similarly, other sitting judges (both state and federal) and legal commentators defended Persky's decision, noted that the sentence might, in their opinion, be disproportionate due to the lifelong consequences of a criminal conviction and sex offender registration, and called on the bar to protect the independence of the judiciary.

In June 2016, at least ten prospective jurors refused to serve in a misdemeanor trial for possession of stolen property where Persky was presiding, citing the judge's sentencing of Turner as a reason. The following week, Rosen filed a peremptory motion for recusal in a case where Persky was to preside over the criminal trial of a surgical nurse charged with sexual battery for allegedly touching the genitals of a patient under sedation. Rosen called his move to have the judge removed from the case, "a rare and carefully considered step for our office."

As a result of the backlash in the wake of his sentencing, Persky asked not to hear any more criminal cases and was reassigned to the Civil Division of the California Court system.

The Santa Clara County Registrar of Voters, on January 24, 2018, confirmed that sufficient signatures had been verified to put the recall on the ballot. There were 94,539 signatures submitted, only a fraction of which were verified in order to reach the total needed to qualify. The recall issue was on the state elections ballot on June 5, 2018. The California Commission on Judicial Performance found that Persky had not abused his discretion. He was supported by dozens of law school professors, retired judges, and the Santa Clara Bar Association. He stood by his sentencing, saying he's been unfairly targeted as the "face of rape" by recall advocates. At the same time he admitted, "There is an underlying deep frustration among actual victims of sexual assault and women in general about the criminal justice system not taking sexual assault and domestic violence seriously. It's a very genuine and important problem." "The passion is authentic, the end is justified, let's increase sexual assault reporting. Let's do criminal justice reform where it's smart to do so." In a press conference in May 2018, Persky compared his sentence handed down in the Turner case to that of Brown v. Board of Education.

In a May 18, 2018 interview, Persky stated he had no regrets, and would rule exactly the same again on this case.

Two women, Cindy Hendrickson, a Santa Clara County assistant district attorney, and Angela Storey, a civil attorney, appeared on the ballot to take Persky's position in the event of his successful recall. Storey opposed the recall on principle. When the election results were being tabulated, and they indicated Persky would be recalled, Professor Dauber stated, "The vote today ... is a vote against impunity for high-status offenders of domestic violence and sexual violence." Hendrickson won the election to take Persky's place. Persky left the bench and Hendrickson was sworn in ten days after the election results were certified. In the June 5, 2018 primary election, nearly 200,000 Santa Clara County voters turned out, voting to remove Persky by 61.51% to 38.49%, a margin of over 23%. Persky was the first judge to be recalled by voters in California in 86 years and the first in the United States since 1977.

In 2023, Harvard Law School lecturer Rebecca Richman Cohen produced the short documentary The Recall: Reframed exploring the unintended consequences of the recall of Judge Aaron Persky which came at the height of the #MeToo movement in 2018. The film cites the Turner case to critique the demand for harsh sentences to address sexual violence, which Cohen says disproportionately impacts low-income and people of color.

==== Persky ordered to pay legal fees ====
The county clerk had 28 days to certify the recall election results, ten days after which Hendrickson would take Persky's place on the bench. Persky was ordered to pay $161,000 in restitution for lawsuits he filed against the recall. He sought over $135,000 in donations from the public to cover attorney fees after the $840,000 previously raised had been exhausted.

==== Revisit of previous civil case of alleged gang rape ====
In 2011, Persky presided over a civil lawsuit against multiple members of the De Anza College baseball team, who were accused by plaintiff "Jane Doe" of gang-raping the then-underage girl while she was unconscious, until another party attendee who heard the commotion intervened. The civil trial came after the District Attorney had declined to prosecute a criminal case, as she thought evidence was lacking. During the civil trial, Persky decided that the jury should be allowed to view photographs of the plaintiff taken at another party she attended approximately a year after the alleged gang rape, as per the defense's claim that this evidence contradicted the plaintiff's claims of suffering from post-traumatic stress disorder. The jury found the defendants not liable.

Following Turner's sentencing in 2016, the plaintiff's attorneys in the De Anza case criticized Persky for allowing the photos into evidence. Attorneys for Doe said the photographs were not the only evidence that Persky unfairly permitted. Four of the baseball players had invoked Fifth Amendment rights not to self-incriminate during the discovery phase of the litigation. According to a lawyer for Doe, that was a critical juncture: it prevented their legal team from obtaining evidence that could have helped them pursue their case. The original judge in the case ruled in 2010 that the defendants could refuse to testify, but that meant that they would be prohibited from subsequently testifying in the case. That prohibition was lifted by Persky after he took over the trial in 2011, a move that Doe's attorneys say undermined her case.

== Statements ==
=== Defendant's statements ===
After the guilty verdict, Turner said to his probation officer that the encounter was consensual. He also gave an 11-page statement to the judge that said he received verbal consent from the woman before she passed out.

According to Turner's statement, he and Miller drank, danced, and kissed at the party. Sometime around midnight, according to Turner, he asked her whether she would like to go back to his dorm and she said yes. He claimed that she had slipped behind a wooden shed, whereupon he sat down on the ground with her and engaged in consensual sexual activity, until he became nauseous and walked away to throw up.

Turner stated, "It debilitates me to think that my actions have caused her emotional and physical stress that is completely unwarranted and unfair."

=== Victim impact statements ===
==== Publication by BuzzFeed ====
BuzzFeed's publication of the victim impact statement

On June 2, 2016, Miller read a 7,138-word victim impact statement aloud in the sentencing phase of the trial. The New York Times described the statement as a "cri de coeur against the role of privilege in the trial and the way the legal system deals with sexual assault." On June 3, 2016, Palo Alto Online and BuzzFeed published Doe's full statement. BuzzFeed's publication rapidly went viral, achieving over 8 million views in three days, driven by widespread sharing on social media.

In one statement, she detailed the negative effects Turner had on her life: "You took away my worth, my privacy, my energy, my time, my safety, my intimacy, my confidence, my own voice, until today." The statement also detailed the effect on Miller's ability to remain in her full-time job, which she left afterward "because continuing day to day was not possible."

Miller's statement also described her experience at the hospital and learning she was being treated for sexual assault: "The next thing I remember I was in a gurney in a hallway. I had dried blood and bandages on the backs of my hands and elbow. ... My brain was talking my gut into not collapsing. Because my gut was saying, help me, help me." Miller expresses gratitude to "the intern who made me oatmeal when I woke up at the hospital that morning, to the deputy who waited beside me, to the nurses who calmed me, to the detective who listened to me and never judged me, to my advocates who stood unwaveringly beside me, to my therapist who taught me to find courage in vulnerability."

The statement articulated that "social class" should not be factored into the sentence: "The fact that Brock was a star athlete at a prestigious university should not be seen as an entitlement to leniency, but as an opportunity to send a strong cultural message that sexual assault is against the law regardless of social class." Miller also disagreed with the probation officer's assessment that Turner had shown remorse, stating that Turner had failed to show genuine remorse and this was a factor in her anger at the brief sentence.

==== Released by Santa Clara County ====
The victim's statement was subsequently formally released by Santa Clara County and was picked up by national and international media including The Washington Post, CBS News, Los Angeles Times, Time, The Mercury News, Cosmopolitan and the UK's The Guardian. The letter went viral, shared over 11 million times in four days. CNN anchor Ashleigh Banfield read most of the statement aloud during a 20-minute segment of CNN's Legal View.

==== Read in U.S. Congress ====
External image
- Words From a Sexual Assault Survivor to Her Attacker -- read into the Congressional Record on the floor of the United States House of Representatives by multiple members of the United States Congress.

Image of Congressional Record, text to the page on June 15, 2016, where members of U.S. Congress read the victim statement in the case of People v. Turner.

On June 15, 2016, a bipartisan group of eighteen members of the House of Representatives took turns reading the statement on the House floor. Representative Jackie Speier organized the reading to raise awareness about sexual assault and to promote her legislation on campus sexual assault. Representative Ann McLane Kuster, Democrat from New Hampshire, said news of the attack led her to identify herself as the victim of sexual assaults, and to focus legislative efforts on the problem. Representative Paul Gosar, Republican of Arizona, said: "People need to learn from this, ... This should matter to everyone." Cheri Bustos claimed a need for more women in the house to bring the issue of sexual assault to the forefront.

Then-Vice President Joe Biden wrote Doe an open letter titled, "An Open Letter to a Courageous Young Woman," which read in part, "I am filled with furious anger — both that this happened to you and that our culture is still so broken that you were ever put in the position of defending your own worth."

=== Prosecutor's statements ===
Santa Clara County District Attorney Jeffrey F. Rosen stated that "the punishment does not fit the crime." Rosen described Turner as a "predatory offender" and stated he "has failed to take responsibility, failed to show remorse and failed to tell the truth," and added, "Campus rape is no different than off-campus rape. Rape is rape. And I will prosecute it as such."

=== Juror's statement ===
A juror calling himself "A Concerned Juror" said this was his first time as a juror since recently becoming a U.S. citizen, after residing in the country for three decades. He wrote a letter to the judge expressing dissatisfaction with the sentencing length. The juror said that "the fact that Turner ran away after two Stanford graduate students noticed him on top of an unmoving woman" was compelling evidence, along with the incoherence of the message that Doe left her boyfriend before meeting Brock. The juror believed this was very strong evidence "that Turner should have reasonably known she was not able to give consent."

=== Statements by Turner's family and friends ===
On June 4, Michele Dauber posted a letter written by Dan Turner, Brock's father, asking for leniency for his son, arguing that the punishment was a "steep price to pay for 20 minutes of action out of his 20 plus years of life." The letter sparked outrage and was cited as an example of the prevalence of rape culture.

Dauber also circulated, again via Twitter, a letter written by Leslie Rasmussen, a female childhood friend of Turner, that defended Turner and blamed alcohol consumption and universities for advertising themselves as "party schools". The letter was met with further criticism. The publication of her letter, in which she also said Brock came from "a respectable family," led to cancellations of her band (Good English)'s engagements. Rasmussen soon disavowed the letter, writing on Facebook, "I did not acknowledge strongly enough the severity of Brock's crime and the suffering and pain that his victim endured, and for that lack of acknowledgement, I am deeply sorry."

Writing to the court and recommending against prison, Oakwood, Ohio Judge Margaret M. Quinn, a Turner family friend and retired federal prosecutor, also blamed the assault on alcohol, minimizing Turner's culpability. "He made a mistake in drinking excessively to the point where he could not fully appreciate that his female acquaintance was so intoxicated. I know Brock did not go to that party intending to hurt, or entice, or overpower anyone."

Brock's character was defended by at least 39 people including his ex-girlfriend who said he never pressured her and that he was kind, loving and respectful.

=== Miller's family's statements ===
Chanel Miller's sister, Tiffany, (referred to by police at the time as "Jane Doe 2") wrote a letter saying "an entire part of my heart has been permanently broken" by the assault, the lengthy prosecution, and Turner's failure to take responsibility for his actions.

=== Police reports ===
The Stanford University Department of Public Safety provided the initial response and investigation. A felony complaint was filed in the Superior Court for the County of Santa Clara on January 28, 2015.

The story was first disclosed to the public by The Fountain Hopper, an anonymous campus newsletter, after a line from the police blotter caught the interest of its editors.

Turner had a prior campus law enforcement encounter when he was found by Stanford University police to be a minor in possession of cans of beer on November 11, 2014. He was cited as well for possession of a counterfeit Ohio driver's license. In addition, after subsequent publicized reports of the January 18, 2015, sexual assault incident, another female reported that Turner had made similar unwelcome physical advances toward her at a Kappa Alpha party on January 9, 2015.

== Jail and aftermath ==
Turner was released from Santa Clara County jail on September 2, 2016, having served three months of his six-month sentence. The corrections officers who had kept him in protective custody gave Turner a package of hate mail which had built up during his stay as he exited prison.

Under the terms of his release, Turner was mandated to live with his parents in Sugarcreek Township, Ohio, where he was to register as a sex offender. He was placed on three years probation with reciprocal supervision through the Greene County, Ohio, Sheriff's Office. Conditions of probation included abstention from drugs and alcohol during that period.

The day of his release, Turner's parents contacted the police, expressing concern about protesters being a danger to their safety. The day after his release, protesters gathered on the sidewalk outside his family's Ohio home, several of them carrying guns and affiliated with an anarchist group that regularly organizes armed protests in Ohio.

== Unsuccessful appeal ==
At the time of his conviction, it was reported that Turner's legal appeal would be led by attorney Dennis Riordan, who represented former baseball player Barry Bonds in a perjury case. Riordan was present in court Thursday, June 2 with Turner's initial attorney Michael Armstrong.

Turner appealed his conviction and sentence to the California Courts of Appeal in December 2017. He argued that his conviction should be overturned, that his lifetime requirement to register as a sex offender be canceled, and that he be given a new trial, on the grounds that the prosecutor claimed that the assault took place behind a trash bin, but the victim was found behind a garbage enclosure. Turner also argued that the jury should have been given the option to consider less serious charges and that he should have been able to call character witnesses. Oral argument was held on June 28, 2018, in San Jose.

On August 8, 2018, the court of appeals affirmed Turner's conviction and sentence. He tried to argue that he had intended to engage in outercourse, not intercourse, with Miller. The court of appeals was not persuaded and concluded that the appropriate course of action was to require Turner to register as a sex offender for the rest of his life.

== Legacy ==
=== California legislation ===
The public outrage at the sentence in the Turner case prompted the California State Legislature to pass two bills that would change California state law on sexual assault. Assembly Bill 701 would broaden California's definition of rape so that it would include digital as well as penile penetration. Assembly Bill 2888 (written by District Attorney Jeff Rosen) would provide for a mandatory minimum three-year prison sentence for sexual assault of an unconscious or intoxicated person. (Previously California law provided a mandatory minimum prison sentence when a defendant uses force, but had no mandatory minimum sentence when the victim is unconscious or incapacitated and unable to resist.)

The final versions of A.B. 2888 and A.B. 701 were both unanimously approved by the California legislature. Both bills subsequently went to Governor Jerry Brown's desk. The bills were signed into law on September 30, 2016.

After these laws were enacted, state law from before 2016 continued to provide that where imprisonment in the state prison is imposed for rape (when the victim is not a minor) or for the crime of sexual penetration when the victim is "prevented from resisting by any intoxicating or anesthetic substance," the imprisonment is for a period of "three, six, or eight years."

=== Textbook definition of rape ===
Turner's mugshot used as the accompanying photo for the section on rape in a 2017 criminal justice textbook

The second edition of the criminal justice textbook Introduction to Criminal Justice (ISBN 9781506347721), by University of Colorado, Denver, Professors Callie Marie Rennison and Mary Dodge, uses Turner's mugshot as the accompanying photo in the entry that defines rape. According to the caption beneath Turner's photo, which appears on Page 20 at the top of the section in the book on "rape":

Brock Turner, a Stanford student who raped and assaulted an unconscious female student behind a dumpster at a fraternity party, was recently released from jail after serving only three months. Some are shocked at how short this sentence is. Others who are more familiar with the way sexual violence has been handled in the criminal justice system are shocked that he was found guilty and served any time at all. What do you think?

The book was published in January 2017. In September 2017, an image of the page was widely circulated on social media. Rennison, who was awarded the Bonnie S. Fisher Victimology Career Award in 2016, explained in reference to her acceptance of that award that the textbook is her attempt to change the dialogue about victims of crime and its perpetrators within the criminal justice community, saying:

Existing criminal justice books have focused on three elements: cops, courts and corrections. They speak little about victims, reflecting how they have effectively been in the shadows of our criminal justice system. In our book, victims are front and center with equal emphasis as cops, courts and corrections. This is the way it should be.

=== Law & Order: Special Victims Unit ===
The eighteenth season of the television program Law & Order: Special Victims Unit highlighted the People v. Turner case, in its episode titled "Rape Interrupted". The episode, which was influenced by the case, guest-starred Anthony Edwards as Sgt. Patrick Griffin, Benson's first partner out of the Academy. Griffin's son is the suspect in a rape investigation that puts Benson at odds with Griffin and the Assistant District Attorney.

Executive producer Julie Martin told The Huffington Post, "It is a phenomenon. Unfortunately, there have been several cases like that over the spring and the summer." Mariska Hargitay pondered if a similar case were to happen on the show: "Like if I was the detective on that case? It could be healing to somebody to see what should happen. [Seeing] justice. If a judge would do a different sentence. You know, that's healing for people to see the right thing, the just thing happen."

=== Book by Chanel Miller ===
In September 2019, Chanel Miller, who had been known publicly only as "Emily Doe" in the case, came forward to identify herself as the woman Turner assaulted. She released a book titled Know My Name: A Memoir on September 4, 2019. She first began work on the book in 2017, as an endeavor to reappropriate her narrative identity and describe the trauma she went through, after being referred to in the press as "unconscious intoxicated woman." The author discusses her experience of the assault and the trial, as well as how she has coped since then. Through research for the work, Miller perused court transcripts and testimony of individuals involved in the court proceedings—materials she had been unable to view throughout the trial of Brock Turner itself.

The book was initially published by Viking Books, through efforts by the publisher's editor-in-chief Andrea Schulz. Schulz took quick action after being contacted by Miller's literary agent, Philippa Brophy. Schulz worked to acquire the rights to the book because of Miller's writing skill and her compelling account. The same month as the book's publication, Miller was interviewed on the CBS News program 60 Minutes, where she read from her original victim impact statement.

U.S. Congresswoman Jackie Speier, who coordinated the June 2016 movement in Congress to openly read the text of Miller's victim statement to the United States House of Representatives, called the book "a powerful example of how we can overcome adversity." Stanford law professor Michele Dauber commented, "When people read her book, they will be impressed with her. They will be convinced that Judge Persky and Stanford University behaved very badly."

After Miller made the decision to go public with her real name, Stanford University released a statement: "We applaud Ms. Miller's bravery in talking publicly about the ordeal she has experienced and the horrible act that she suffered on our campus. As a university, we are continuing our efforts to prevent and respond effectively to sexual violence, with the ultimate goal of eradicating it from our community."

== See also ==
- Ethan Couch
- 1995 Okinawa rape incident
- 2024 Cornell University rape allegations
- Crime in California
- Robert H. Richards IV
