= Sexual assault response team =

A sexual assault response team is an organized group of individuals, professionals, and officials who promote a community-wide approach to end sexual violence and help victims of sexual assault to navigate the complexities of medical, emotional, and legal issues along with the associated procedures. Because a sexual assault sometimes involves physical injury and often leaves the victim in emotional shock, these eponymous local organizations are formed and advertised for quick reference and rapid assistance.

== Statement ==
Joye E. Frost, Acting Director of the Office for Victims of Crime, has stated:

Sexual assault is an enduring crime throughout our Nation, crossing all socioeconomic, cultural, and geographic boundaries. While more victims are coming forward, it is estimated that even now, only one in four reports the crime. Clearly, much remains to be done in raising awareness of available services and providing skilled, compassionate assistance. No one deserves to be sexually assaulted, but when someone is sexually victimized, it is our duty as professionals to be prepared and knowledgeable so that we may help lessen the potentially overwhelming effects victims may experience.

== Motivation ==
The federal US Office for Victims of Crime encourages the development of local sexual assault response teams to address advocacy, culturally specific practices, health care, law enforcement, the development and staffing of crime laboratories, prosecution, and collaborative partnerships.

The National Sexual Violence Resource Center, a non-profit organization, also supports the establishment of local sexual assault response team, as does The National Center for Campus Public Safety.
