= Nan =

Nan or NAN may refer to:

== Places ==
=== China ===
- Nan County, Yiyang, Hunan, China
- Nan Commandery, historical commandery in Hubei, China

=== Fiji ===
- Nadi International Airport (IATA code NAN), Fiji

=== Thailand ===
- Nan province
  - Nan, Thailand, the administrative capital of Nan province
- Nan River

== People ==
=== Given name ===
- Nan A. Talese (born 1933), American retired editor
- Nan Achnas (born 1963), Indonesian film director
- Nan Agle (1905–2006), American children's book writer
- Nan Allely, Irish former lawn- and indoor bowler
- Nan Aron (born 1948), American lawyer
- Nan Aspinwall (1880–1964), American oriental dancer, horsewoman, sharpshooter, and roper
- Nan Aye Khine (born 1976), Burmese weightlifter
- Nan B. Frank (1886–1980), American social worker and women's suffrage leader
- Nan Baird (1911–1993), Scottish amateur golfer
- Nan Baker (born 1954), American Republican politician
- Nan Bangs McKinnell (1913–2012), American ceramicist and educator
- Nan Bentzen Skille (born 1945), Norwegian biographer and columnist
- Nan Bernstein Ratner, American professor and board-recognized specialist in child language disorders
- Nan Blair (1891–1944), American screenwriter and literary agent
- Nan Bosler (born 1935), Australian community activist and advocate for young people, the elderly, and people with disabilities
- Nan Braunton (1895–1978), British actress
- Nan Brooks, American children's book illustrator
- Nan Campbell (1926−2013), American politician
- Nan Chauncy (1900–1970), British-born Australian children's writer
- Nan Cohen (born 1968), American poet and teacher
- Nan Cross (1928–2007), South African anti-apartheid and anti-conscription activist
- Nan Ogburn Cullman (1929–2015), American singer, explorer, and philanthropist
- Nan Cuz (1927–2019), German–Guatemalan painter
- Nan Dieter-Conklin (1926–2014), American radio astronomer
- Nan Dirk de Graaf (born 1958), Dutch sociologist
- Nan Doak-Davis (born 1962), American former long-distance runner
- Nan Dunbar (1928–2005), Scottish academic
- Nan Fairbrother (1913–1971), English writer and lecturer on landscape and land use
- Nan Fry (1945–2016), American poet
- Nan Giese (1922–2012), Australian leader in education and the visual and performing arts
- Nan Gindele (1910–1992), American athlete
- Nan Goldin (born 1953), American photographer and activist
- Nan Green (1904–1984), British communist
- Nan Grey (1918–1993), American film actress
- Nan Grogan Orrock (born 1943), American member of the Georgia House of Representatives and State Senator
- Nan Halperin (1898–1963), Russian-born American singing comedian
- Nan Hayworth (born 1959), American ophthalmologist and former U.S. Representative from New York's 19th Congressional District
- Nan Hoover (1931–2008), Dutch/American-expatriate artist
- Nan Hunt (1918–2015), Australian children's writer
- Nan Hutton (1917–1984), Australian journalist, columnist, and writer
- Nan Inger Östman (1923–2015), Swedish author of children's literature
- Nan Ino Cooper, 10th Baroness Lucas (1880–1958), British nurse and educator
- Nan Joyce (1940–2018), Irish Travellers' rights activist
- Nan Kelley (born c. 1965), American former Miss Mississippi (1985)
- Nan Kempner (1930–2005), American New York socialite
- Nan Kinross (1926–2021), New Zealand nurse and nursing academic
- Nan Knighton, American poet, playwright, and lyricist
- Nan Laird (born 1943), American professor of public health
- Nan Lawson Cheney (1897–1985), Canadian painter and medical artist
- Nan Leslie (1926–2000), American actress
- Nan Levinson (born 1949), American writer, journalist, and teacher
- Nan Lurie (1906–1985), American printmaker and engraver
- Nan Macpherson Smith (d. 1940), Canadian leader in women’s activities, and patriotic, philanthropic, cultural projects
- Nan Marie Jokerst, American professor of electrical- and computer engineering
- Nan Marriott-Watson (1899–1982), British character actress and Broadway theatre performer
- Nan Martin (1927–2010), American actress and comedian
- Nan Mason (1896–1982), American painter and photographer
- Nan McDonald (1921–1974), Australian poet and editor
- Nan McDonald, Canadian candidate in the Communist Party of Canada candidates in the 1984 Canadian federal election
- Nan McKay (1892–1986), Métis librarian
- Nan Melville (1949–2022), American photographer
- Nan Merriman (1920–2012), American operatic mezzo-soprano
- Nan Moe Moe Htwe (born 1983), Burmese politician
- Nan Murphy, Canadian candidate in the Liberal-Progressive Party candidates in the 1953 Manitoba provincial election
- Nan Ni Ni Aye (born 1969), Burmese politician
- Nan Nyunt Swe (1923–2010), Burmese writer
- Nan Peete (born 1938), American Episcopal priest
- Nan Phelps (1904–1990), American folk artist
- Nan Rae (born 1944), Scottish former competitive swimmer
- Nan Ribera (born 1975), Spanish retired footballer
- Nan Rich (born 1942), American member of the Florida Senate and former member of the House of Representatives
- Nan C. Robertson (1926–2009), American Pulitzer Prize-winning journalist, author, and instructor in journalism
- Nan Ryan (1936–2017), American writer of romance novels
- Nan Sandar Hla Htun (born 1993), Burmese actress, model, and former beauty queen
- Nan Sheets (1885–1976), American painter, printmaker, and museum director
- Nan Shepherd (1893–1981), Scottish Modernist writer and poet
- Nan Su Yati Soe (born 1987), Burmese actress, model, singer, and TV host
- Nan Thuzar Win (born 1981), Burmese politician
- Nan Tom Teaimín de Búrca, Irish traditional sean-nós singer
- Nan Wood Honeyman, (1881–1970), American first woman elected to the U.S. Congress from Oregon
- Nan Youngman (1906–1995), English painter and educationalist

=== Chinese name ===
- Nan (diviner), a prominent diviner during the Shang dynasty.
- Nan Geng, a king of the Shang dynasty of ancient China
- Nan Hanchen (1895–1967), Chinese governor
- Nan Hu, Chinese physician-scientist, molecular geneticist, and cancer epidemiologist
- Nan Huai-Chin (1918–2012), Chinese Buddhist monk, religious scholar, teacher, and writer
- Nan Lin (born 1938), Chinese professor of sociology
- Nan Qi (artist) (born 1960), Chinese artist
- Nan Rendong (1945–2017), Chinese astronomer of Manchu descent
- Nan Song (disambiguation)
- Nan Xiaoheng (born 1995), Chinese footballer
- Nan Yunqi (born 1993), Chinese football player
- Nan Zhang (actress) (born 1986), Chinese-American actress
- King Nan of Zhou (r. 314–256 BC), last ruler of the Chinese Zhou dynasty
- Luo Nan (born 1986), Chinese swimmer
- Sima Nan (born 1956), Chinese television pundit and journalist
- Song Nan (born 1990), Chinese figure skater
- Wang Nan (disambiguation)
- Yu Nan (born 1978), Chinese actress
- Zhang Nan (disambiguation)
- Zhou Nan (born 1927), Chinese politician and diplomat

=== Family name ===
- Nan (surname) (南), Chinese surname
- Mohd Fauzi Nan (born 1980), Malaysian football player

=== Nickname ===
- Nan Britton (1896–1991), mistress of President Warren G. Harding
- Nannerl O. Keohane (born 1940), American political theorist and former president of Wellesley College and Duke University
- Nan Merriman (1920–2012), American operatic singer

=== Fictional people ===
- Nan (American Horror Story)

=== Other ===
- English familiar term for grandmother

== Arts and entertainment ==
- Nan, a play by the English poet John Masefield, first produced in 1908, also known as The Tragedy of Nan
- Nan, nickname of the character Joanie Taylor, from the Catherine Tate Show
- "Nân" (song), a 2025 song by Alis

== Organisations ==
- National Action Network, American civil rights organization
- Nishnawbe Aski Nation
- Northern Access Network, an unlicensed television system in Canada launched in the late 1970s by David Brough

== Science and technology ==
- NaN (not a number), used in computer arithmetic and defined in the IEEE floating-point standard
- NaN (congress), 20th Chaos Communication Congress in 2003
- NAN-190, a drug and research chemical widely used in scientific studies
- Near-me area network, a communication network that focuses on wireless communication among devices in close proximity
- Neighborhood Aware Networking, in Android O
- NMDA Antagonist Neurotoxicity, a potential form of brain damage
- Sodium azide, a chemical compound with the formula NaN_{3}

== Other uses ==
- News Agency of Nigeria
- Norwegian Air Norway
- Southern Min (ISO 639-3 language code nan), a language originated from China
- Tandyr nan, Central Asian flatbread
- Naan, flatbread

== See also ==
- Naan (disambiguation)
