= Ziegenfuss =

Ziegenfuss is a German surname that means "goat foot". Alternative spellings include Ziegenfus, Zickafoose, Zickefoose, Zeigenfuse, Sickafaus, Sickafus, Sigafoes, Sickafoose, etc. Notable people with the surnames include:

== Ziegenfuss ==
- George Ziegenfuss (1917–2007), American basketball player and coach
- Oma Ziegenfuss, pseudonym of Georg Schäfer (1926–1990), German painter, poet, and author who lived in Guatemala and the United States
- Valerie Ziegenfuss (born 1949), American tennis player

== Alternative spellings ==
- Todd Sickafoose (born 1974), American musical artist
- Julie Zickefoose (born 1958), American biologist and nature book writer
