= Neil Patterson =

Neil Patterson may refer to:

- Neil Patterson (artist), Canadian artist
- Neil Patterson (athlete) (1885–1948), American athlete

== See also ==
- Neal Patterson (1949–2017), CEO of Cerner
- Neil Paterson (disambiguation)
