= Neil Paterson =

Neil Paterson may refer to:

- Neil Paterson (figure skater) (born 1964), Canadian figure skater
- Neil Paterson (writer) (1915–1995), Scottish writer of novels, short stories and screenplays
- Neil Paterson (rugby union) (born 1975), rugby union player and referee

== See also ==
- Neal Patterson (1949–2017), American businessman
- Neil Patterson (disambiguation)
