= Janet Fish =

American painter (1938–2025)

- Born: Janet Isobel Fish; May 18, 1938; Boston, Massachusetts, U.S.
- Died: December 11, 2025 (aged 87); Wells, Vermont, U.S.
- Education: Smith College, The Skowhegan School of Art, Yale University School of Art and Architecture
- Known for: Still life paintings; art instructor at the School of Visual Arts, Parsons The New School for Design, Syracuse University, and the University of Chicago
- Movement: Realist

Black Bowl Red Scarf by Janet Fish

Janet Isobel Fish (May 18, 1938 – December 11, 2025) was an American contemporary realist artist. Through oil painting, lithography, and screenprinting, she explored the interaction of light with everyday objects in the still life genre. Many of her paintings include elements of transparency (plastic wrap, water), reflected light, and multiple overlapping patterns depicted in bold, high color values. She has been credited with revitalizing the still life genre.

== Early life and education ==
Janet Isobel Fish was born on May 18, 1938, in Boston, Massachusetts, and was raised in Bermuda, where her family moved when she was ten years old. From a young age, she was surrounded by many artistic influences. Her father was professor of art history Peter Stuyvesant Fish and her mother was sculptor and potter Florence Whistler Voorhees. Her sister, Alida, is a photographer. Her grandfather, whose studio was in Bermuda, was American Impressionist painter Clark Voorhees. Her uncle, also named Clark Voorhees, was a wood carver and his wife, a painter.

Fish knew from a young age that she wanted to pursue the visual arts. She said, "I came from a family of artists, and I always made art and knew I wanted to be an artist." Fish was talented in ceramics and she initially intended to be a sculptor. As a teenager, Fish was an assistant in the studio of sculptor Byllee Lang.

Fish attended Smith College, in Northampton, Massachusetts, concentrating on sculpture and printmaking. She studied under George Cohn, Leonard Baskin, and Mervin Jules. She spent one of her summers studying at the Art Students League of New York and attended a painting class led by Stephen Greene. Fish received a Bachelor of Arts from Smith in 1960. This was followed by a summer residency at The Skowhegan School of Art in Skowhegan, Maine in 1961.

Fish enrolled at the Yale University School of Art and Architecture in New Haven, Connecticut, attending from 1960 to 1963. There she changed her focus from sculpture to painting. Her instructor for an introductory painting class was Alex Katz, who encouraged students to explore the shows in New York galleries which expanded Fish's knowledge of the art world. During that period, art schools tended to favor the teaching of Abstract Expressionism, influencing Fish's burgeoning artistic style. She soon developed her own direction noting that "Abstract Expressionism didn't mean anything to me. It was a set of rules."

Her fellow Yale students included Chuck Close, Richard Serra, Brice Marden, Nancy Graves, Sylvia and Robert Mangold, and Rackstraw Downes. In 1963, Fish became one of the first women to earn a Master of Fine Arts from Yale's School of Art and Architecture.

== Work ==
Fish largely rejected the Abstract Expressionism endorsed by her Yale instructors feeling "totally disconnected" from it and desiring instead the "physical presence of objects". Undaunted by the dogma of pure abstraction which reigned in her formative years, Janet Fish connected with images in the real world. Rooted in the Modernist formal tradition and the Dutch still life genre tradition, her work adheres to the world of concrete contemporary experience. Fish's simple, familiar subjects are rendered with formal complexity, richness of detail and the vibrant, tropical palette of her childhood.

Fish was interested in painting light and a concept she on occasion called "packaging", such as jars, cellophane, and wrappers.

Among her other favorite subjects were everyday objects, especially various kinds of clear glassware, either empty or partially filled with liquids such as water, liquor, or vinegar. Examples range from glasses, bottles, goblets, and jars to a fishbowl filled with water and a goldfish. Other subjects included teacups, flower bouquets, textiles with interesting patterns, goldfish, vegetables, and mirrored surfaces.

Although Fish's work has been characterized as Photorealist or New Realism, she did not consider herself a photorealist. Elements, such as her composition and use of color, demonstrate the view of a painter rather than a photographer.

== Career ==
After graduating from Yale, Fish spent a year in Philadelphia then moved to SoHo where she became friends with Louise Nevelson.

Fish was an art instructor at the School of Visual Arts and Parsons The New School for Design (both in New York City), Syracuse University (Syracuse, New York), and the University of Chicago.

Fish had two short-lived marriages, which she claimed were unsuccessful at least partly due to her high ambitions and her reluctance to be a "good conventional housewife". In her later years, she resided, and painted, in her SoHo, New York City, loft and her Vermont farmhouse in Middletown Springs.

== Death ==
Fish died in Wells, Vermont, on December 11, 2025, at the age of 87.

== Exhibitions ==
Fish's first solo show was at Rutherford, New Jersey's Fairleigh Dickinson University in 1967 and her first New York exhibition followed two years later. Fish exhibited over 75 times nationally and internationally. Below is a selection of the exhibitions of her work.

- Janet Fish, Pinwheels and Poppies, Paintings 1980–2008, DC Moore Gallery, New York, 2017, solo exhibition
- Janet Fish, Glass & Plastic, The Early Years, 1968-1978, DC Moore Gallery, New York, 2016, solo exhibition
- The Annual 2015: The Depth of the Surface, National Academy of Design, New York, 2015, group exhibition
- This American Life, Kemper Museum of Contemporary Art, Kansas City, MO, 2014, group exhibition
- Fall Fantasy - Small Scale Works, Marianne Friedland Gallery, Naples, FL, 2014, group exhibition
- Janet Fish, Panoply, DC Moore Gallery, New York, NY, 2014, solo exhibition
- Compelling Images, Makeready Press Gallery, Montclair, NJ, 2013, group exhibition
- Janet Fish, Recent Paintings, DC Moore Gallery, New York, 2012, solo exhibition
- Janet Fish, The Butler Institute of American Art, Youngstown, OH, 2006, solo exhibition
- The Art of Janet Fish, Ogunquit Museum of American Art, Ogunquit, ME, 2004, solo exhibition
- Janet Fish, LewAllen Contemporary, Santa Fe, NM, 2004, solo exhibition
- Janet Fish, Samuel P. Harn Museum of Art, Gainesville, FL, 2003, solo exhibition
- Janet Fish, The Columbus Museum, Columbus, GA, 2000, solo exhibition
- Janet Fish, Paintings and Drawings Since 1975, Marsh Gallery, University of Richmond, 1987, solo exhibition
- 76 Jefferson, Museum of Modern Art, 1975, group exhibition
- New York Exhibition, 1969, solo exhibition
- Fairleigh Dickinson University, 1967, solo exhibition

== Recognition ==
The catalog of Fish's University of Richmond exhibition reported that critic Gerrit Henry had described Fish as an acknowledged master of the contemporary still life.

A writer for The New York Times said that Fish's "ambitious still life painting helped resuscitate realism in the 1970's" and that she imbued everyday objects with a "bold optical and painterly energy". Critic Vincent Katz concurs, stating that Fish's career "can be summed up as the revitalization of the still-life genre, no mean feat when one considers that still life has often been considered the lowest type of objective painting".

In an interview, American painter Eric Fischl spoke of his admiration for Janet Fish: "She's one of the most interesting realists of her generation. Her work is a touchstone, and tremendously influential. Anyone who deals with domestic still life has to go through her, she's very important."

Fish was honored with various awards and fellowships, including:

- MacDowell Fellowship, 1968, 1969 and 1972
- Harris Award, Chicago Biennale, 1974
- Australia Council for Arts Grant, 1975
- Elected into the National Academy of Design as Associate National Academician, 1990, and National Academician, 1994
- Hubbard Museum Award, 1991
- Aspen Art Museum Woman in Arts Award, 1993
- American Academy of Arts and Letters Award, 1994
- Smith College Medal, 2012

Fish's work is included in the permanent collection of many institutions and museums.

== Museum collections ==
- Albrecht-Kemper Museum of Art, Saint Joseph, Missouri
- American Academy and Institute of Arts and Letters
- Art Institute of Chicago
- Bermuda National Gallery
- Canton Museum of Art
- Cleveland Museum of Art
- Columbia Museum of Art
- Dallas Museum of Art
- Dayton Art Institute
- Farnsworth Art Museum
- Harn Museum of Art
- Huntsville Museum of Art
- Kalamazoo Institute of Arts
- Maier Museum of Art at Randolph College
- Metropolitan Museum of Art
- Mount Holyoke College Art Museum
- Museum of Fine Arts, Boston
- Museum of Fine Arts, Houston
- Museum of Modern Art, New York
- Museum of Victoria
- National Gallery of Art, Washington, D.C.
- North Carolina Museum of Art
- Orlando Museum of Art
- Pennsylvania Academy of the Fine Arts
- Smith College Museum of Art
- Smithsonian American Art Museum
- Westmoreland Museum of American Art
- Whitney Museum of American Art
- Wichita Art Museum
- Yale University Art Gallery

== Sources ==
- Gaze, Delia (1997). Dictionary of women artists. Taylor & Francis. ISBN 978-1-884964-21-3.
- Goldberg, Ira (Fall 2009). "Janet Fish: Reflections". Linea: Journal of the Art Students League of New York. 13 (2). ISSN 1544-4716. Archived from the original on August 31, 2012.
- Kort, Carol (2002). A to Z of American Women in the Visual Arts. Infobase Publishing. ISBN 978-1-4381-0791-2.
