= List of San Diego State Aztecs men's basketball seasons =

This is a list of seasons completed by the San Diego State Aztecs men's college basketball team."SCIAC". SCIAC.

== Seasons ==
Statistics overview
Season	Coach	Overall	Conference	Standing	Postseason
C.E. Peterson (Southern California JC) (1921–1925)
1921–22	C.E. Peterson	14–8	4–1	2nd	
1922–23	C.E. Peterson	17–5	6–0	1st	
1923–24	C.E. Peterson	7–6	5–1	2nd	
1924–25	C.E. Peterson	17–7	3–0	1st	
C.E. Peterson (Independent) (1925–1926)
1925–26	C.E. Peterson	15–4	–		
C.E. Peterson:		70–30	18–2		
Tom McMullen (SCIAC) (1926–1928)
1926–27	Tom McMullen	9–6	5–6	4th	
1927–28	Tom McMullen	10–8	2–6	6th	
1928–29	Tom McMullen; Morris Gross^{[Note A]}	8–8	3–4	4th	
Tom McMullen:		23–17	8–12		
Morris Gross (SCIAC) (1928–1939)
1929–30	Morris Gross	6–6	2–5	5th	
1930–31	Morris Gross	7–3	3–4	4th	
1931–32	Morris Gross	13–2	5–1	1st	
1932–33	Morris Gross	5–6	4–3	3rd	
1933–34	Morris Gross	11–5	10–2	1st	
1934–35	Morris Gross	13–7	5–5	4th	
1935–36	Morris Gross	11–5	7–3	2nd	
1936–37	Morris Gross	17–9	9–1	1st	
1937–38	Morris Gross	20–8	5–3	2nd	
1938–39	Morris Gross	24–7	6–2	1st	NAIA Runner-up
Morris Gross (California Collegiate Athletic Association) (1939–1942)
1939–40	Morris Gross	22–6	3–3	3rd	NAIA Runner-up
1940–41	Morris Gross	24–7	8–4	1st	NAIA National Champion
1941–42	Morris Gross	13–9	8–4	1st	NAIA second round
Morris Gross:		190–85	78–44		
Don DeLauer/Dick Mitchell (Independent) (1942–1943)
1942–43	Don DeLauer; Dick Mitchell^{[Note B]}	14–9	–		
Don DeLauer/Dick Mitchell:		14–9	–		
Alex Alexander (Independent) (1943–1945)
1943–44	Alex Alexander	6–10	–		
1944–45	Alex Alexander	11–16	–		
Alex Alexander:		17–26	–		
Charlie Smith (Independent) (1945–1946)
1945–46	Charlie Smith	18–8	–		
Charlie Smith (California Collegiate Athletic Association) (1946–1948)
1946–47	Charlie Smith	13–5	5–5	2nd	
1947–48	Charlie Smith	14–13	5–5	3rd	
Charlie Smith:		45–26	10–10		
George Ziegenfuss (California Collegiate Athletic Association) (1948–1955)
1948–49	George Ziegenfuss	13–13	6–4	2nd	
1949–50	George Ziegenfuss	14–10	5–5	3rd	
1950–51	George Ziegenfuss	9–19	3–7	5th	
1951–52	George Ziegenfuss	11–12	3–5	5th	
1952–53	George Ziegenfuss	16–12	7–3	2nd	
1953–54	George Ziegenfuss	18–6	8–2	1st	NAIA first round
1954–55	George Ziegenfuss	17–19	5–3	T–2nd	
George Ziegenfuss (Independent) (1955–1956)
1955–56	George Ziegenfuss	23–6	–		NAIA second round
George Ziegenfuss:		121–97	37–29		
George Ziegenfuss (California Collegiate Athletic Association) (1956–1968)
1956–57	George Ziegenfuss	17–10	6–2	1st	NCAA College Division Elite Eight
1957–58	George Ziegenfuss	17–8	9–1	T–1st	
1958–59	George Ziegenfuss	17–8	7–3	2nd	
1959–60	George Ziegenfuss	9–17	2–3	6th	
1960–61	George Ziegenfuss	10–14	3–7	6th	
1961–62	George Ziegenfuss	10–16	5–7	5th	
1962–63	George Ziegenfuss	17–9	8–4	T–2nd	
1963–64	George Ziegenfuss	15–11	6–4	3rd	
1964–65	George Ziegenfuss	14–11	5–5	3rd	
1965–66	George Ziegenfuss	14–12	6–4	T–2nd	
1966–67	George Ziegenfuss	24–5	9–1	1st	NCAA College Division Elite Eight
1967–68	George Ziegenfuss	21–6	11–3	1st	NCAA College Division first round
George Ziegenfuss (Independent) (1968–1969)
1968–69	George Ziegenfuss	10–15		–	
George Ziegenfuss:		195–142	77–44		
Dick Davis (Pacific Coast Athletic Association) (1969–1974)
1969–70	Dick Davis	13–13	3–7	5th	
1970–71	Dick Davis	12–14	3–7	5th	
1971–72	Dick Davis	18–10	7–5	3rd	
1972–73	Dick Davis	15–11	7–5	3rd	
1973–74	Dick Davis	7–19	4–8	T–4th	
Dick Davis:		65–67			
Tim Vezie (Pacific Coast Athletic Association) (1974–1978)
1974–75	Tim Vezie	14–13	6–4	2nd	NCAA Division I first round
1975–76	Tim Vezie	16–13	5–5	T–3rd	NCAA Division I first round
1976–77	Tim Vezie	13–15	9–3	T–1st	
1977–78	Tim Vezie	19–9	11–3	T–1st	
Tim Vezie (Western Athletic Conference) (1978–1979)
1978–79	Tim Vezie	15–12	4–8	T–5th	
Tim Vezie:		77–62			
Smokey Gaines (Western Athletic Conference) (1979–1987)
1979–80	Smokey Gaines	6–21	3–11	T–7th	
1980–81	Smokey Gaines	15–12	8–8	5th	
1981–82	Smokey Gaines	20–9	11–5	2nd	NIT first round
1982–83	Smokey Gaines	18–10	8–8	T–5th	
1983–84	Smokey Gaines	15–13	6–10	T–6th	
1984–85	Smokey Gaines	23–8	11–5	2nd	NCAA Division I first round
1985–86	Smokey Gaines	10–19	7–9	6th	
1986–87	Smokey Gaines	5–25	2–14	T–8th	
Smokey Gaines:		112–117			
Jim Brandenburg (Western Athletic Conference) (1987–1992)
1987–88	Jim Brandenburg	5–23	5–11	7th	
1988–89	Jim Brandenburg	12–17	4–12	9th	
1989–90	Jim Brandenburg	13–18	4–12	8th	
1990–91	Jim Brandenburg	13–16	6–10	T–7th	
1991–92	Jim Brandenburg; Jim Harrick Jr.^{[Note C]}	2–26	0–16	9th	
Jim Brandenburg:		52–87			
Tony Fuller (Western Athletic Conference) (1992–1994)
1992–93	Tony Fuller	8–21	3–15	T–9th	
1993–94	Tony Fuller	12–16	6–12	9th	
Tony Fuller:		20–37			
Fred Trenkle (Western Athletic Conference) (1994–1999)
1994–95	Fred Trenkle	11–17	5–13	9th	
1995–96	Fred Trenkle	15–14	8–10	T–6th	
1996–97	Fred Trenkle	12–15	4–12	7th	
1997–98	Fred Trenkle	13–15	5–9	6th	
1998–99	Fred Trenkle	4–22	2–12	8th	
Fred Trenkle:		55–83			
Steve Fisher (Mountain West Conference) (1999–2017)
1999–00	Steve Fisher	5–23	0–14	8th	
2000–01	Steve Fisher	14–14	4–10	7th	
2001–02	Steve Fisher	21–12	7–7	T–4th	NCAA Division I first round
2002–03	Steve Fisher	16–14	6–8	5th	NIT second round
2003–04	Steve Fisher	14–16	5–9	T–5th	
2004–05	Steve Fisher	11–18	4–10	6th	
2005–06	Steve Fisher	24–9	13–3	1st	NCAA Division I first round
2006–07	Steve Fisher	22–11	10–6	T–3rd	NIT second round
2007–08	Steve Fisher	20–13	9–7	4th	NIT first round
2008–09	Steve Fisher	26–10	11–5	4th	NIT Semifinal
2009–10	Steve Fisher	25–9	11–5	T–3rd	NCAA Division I first round
2010–11	Steve Fisher	34–3	14–2	T–1st	NCAA Division I Sweet Sixteen
2011–12	Steve Fisher	26–8	10–4	T–1st	NCAA Division I first round
2012–13	Steve Fisher	23–11	9–7	4th	NCAA Division I second round
2013–14	Steve Fisher	31–5	16–2	1st	NCAA Division I Sweet Sixteen
2014–15	Steve Fisher	27–9	14–4	T–1st	NCAA Division I second round
2015–16	Steve Fisher	28–10	16–2	1st	NIT Semifinal
2016–17	Steve Fisher	19–14	9–9	6th	
Steve Fisher:		386–209	168–114		
Brian Dutcher (Mountain West Conference) (2017–present)
2017–18	Brian Dutcher	22–11	11–7	T–4th	NCAA Division I first round
2018–19	Brian Dutcher	21–13	11–7	T–4th	
2019–20	Brian Dutcher	30–2	17–1	1st	No postseason held
2020–21	Brian Dutcher	23–5	14–3	1st	NCAA Division I first round
2021–22	Brian Dutcher	23–9	13-4	3rd	NCAA Division I first round
2022–23	Brian Dutcher	32–7	15–3	1st	NCAA Division I Runner-up
2023–24	Brian Dutcher	26–11	11–7	5th	NCAA Division I Sweet Sixteen
2024–25	Brian Dutcher	21–10	14–6	4th	NCAA Division I First Four
2025–26	Brian Dutcher	22–11	14–6	2nd	
Brian Dutcher:		194–79	120–44		
Total:		–			
National champion Postseason invitational champion Conference regular season champion Conference regular season and conference tournament champion Division regular season champion Division regular season and conference tournament champion Conference tournament champion

^A. Tom McMullen coached the first 7 games of the 1928–29 season before being replaced by Morris Gross.
^B. DeLauer and Mitchell were co-head coaches.
^C. Jim Harrick Jr. coached the final 7 games of 1991–92 season.
