= Carlos Perot =

Carlos Perot (1919–2003) was the pseudonym of Carlos Pelikan Rotter, a Chilean artist mostly known for his paintings depicting marine landscapes and scenes. He was, at the time of his death, the only Latin American recognized by the Royal Society of Marine Artists.

== Biography ==
Carlos Pelikan Rotter was born in 1919 in Lautaro to Austrian parents. When he was seven years old he traveled to Austria where he would study with impressionists teachers. The ship on which he sailed had to overcome a strong storm that created an image on young Carlos that would affect the subject of his art for the rest of his life. At 16 he returned to Chile and studied Civil Construction, but his passion for art proved to be stronger. From 1971 he dedicated solely to painting. He mostly painted realistic marine scenes that would earn him honours such as the first prize in the fifty-first anniversary of the Cap Horniers and the official recognition of the Royal Society of Marine Artists. Carlos died on January, 29 of 2003 in Viña del Mar, coastal city where he resided for most of his life.
