= Neil Patterson (artist) =

Canadian artist

Neil Patterson is a Canadian artist and president of the Oil Painters of America (OPA). Born and raised in Moose Jaw, Saskatchewan, he was educated at the University of Calgary.

In 2000 he became the first Canadian to be awarded Signature status by the OPA. Patterson was elected Master OPA in 2000. In 2008 he was elected President of the OPA, thereby becoming the first Canadian to hold that position. Patterson's paintings have been exhibited in the United States, Canada and Asia. In March 2007 the National Art Museum of China exhibited Patterson's paintings.

== Professional affiliations ==
- Alberta Society of Artists (ASA)
- Federation of Canadian Artists (FCA)
- Oil Painters of America (OPA)
- Salmagundi Club New York City, New York

== Awards ==
- 1988-87 Exhibition of Sunshine Art (ESA) Purchase Award, Sunshine Village, Banff, Alberta
- 1989 Exhibition of Sunshine Art (ESA) Purchase Award, Sunshine Village, Banff, Alberta
- Robert Genn Award, Winter Show FCA, Vancouver, British Columbia
- Second Place Award, Fish Creek, Calgary, Alberta
- 1991 Finalist The Artist's Landscape Competition
- 2000 Master Signature Member, Oil Painter of America
