= Nan Lawson Cheney =

Canadian artist (1897-1975)

- Born: 1897; Windsor, Nova Scotia, Canada
- Died: 1985 (aged 87–88); Vancouver, Canada
- Education: Newcombe College Art School, Tulane U., New Orleans, La. (c. 1917-1918); with Max Broedel at the School of Medical Illustration, Johns Hopkins University, Baltimore, Md. (1920-1921); J.W. Beatty at the Ontario College of Art Summer School, Port Hope, Ont.; with Franklin Brownell, Art Assoc. of Ottawa (c. 1926); with Aldro T. Hibbard, Summer School of Drawing & Painting, Rockport, Mass. (1927); with Lilias Torrance Newton, Art Assoc. of Mtl. (c. 1934); with Alexandre Iacovleff, School of the Museum of Fine Arts, Boston (1936)
- Known for: artist, medical illustrator
- Spouse: Dr. Hill Cheney (m. 1924)

Nan Lawson Cheney (1897–1985) was a Canadian painter and medical artist at the University of British Columbia. She worked with several members of the Group of Seven.

== Career ==
Cheney was born in Windsor, Nova Scotia, and spent part of her childhood in Havana, Cuba. She studied at the Newcombe College Art School, Tulane University, New Orleans, Louisiana (c. 1917–1918); and with Max Broedel at the School of Medical Illustration, Johns Hopkins University, Baltimore, Maryland (1920–1921). She then was employed as a medical illustrator at McGill University, Montreal (1921–1924).

She studied fine art with J.W. Beatty at the Ontario College of Art Summer School, Port Hope, Ontario; with Franklin Brownell, Art Associate of Ottawa (c. 1926); with Aldro T. Hibbard, Summer School of Drawing & Painting, Rockport, Massachusetts (1927); with Lilias Torrance Newton, Art Associate of Montreal (c. 1934); and with Alexandre Iacovleff, School of the Museum of Fine Arts, Boston (1936). In the 1930s and 1940s, she travelled widely throughout British Columbia, painting landscapes and industrial subjects. In 1924, she married Dr. Hill Cheney. In 1937, the couple moved to Vancouver, and Nan Cheney became the University of British Columbia's first medical artist. She held this position until 1962.

In Vancouver, Cheney worked with Group of Seven member Lawren Harris and Jock Macdonald, accompanying them on sketching trips. She also worked closely with her friend Emily Carr. Dear Nan: Letters of Emily Carr, Nan Cheney, and Humphrey Toms (edited by Doreen Walker) was published in 1990.

She showed with the British Columbia Society of Fine Arts until 1950. She taught at the Banff School of Fine Arts, Alberta (1936); and taught at U.B.C., Vancouver (1951–1962). Her work is included in the collections of the National Gallery of Canada (which holds Cheney's portrait of Carr) and the Art Gallery of Greater Victoria. She was affiliated with the British Columbia Society of Fine Arts (member in 1937); the Federation of Canadian Artists (1941); and the British Columbia Society of Artists (1950) (she was made a life member in 1957). She died in Vancouver in 1985. The Nan Cheney fonds is in the UBC Library, University of British Columbia. Some of her artworks are held at the BC Archives.

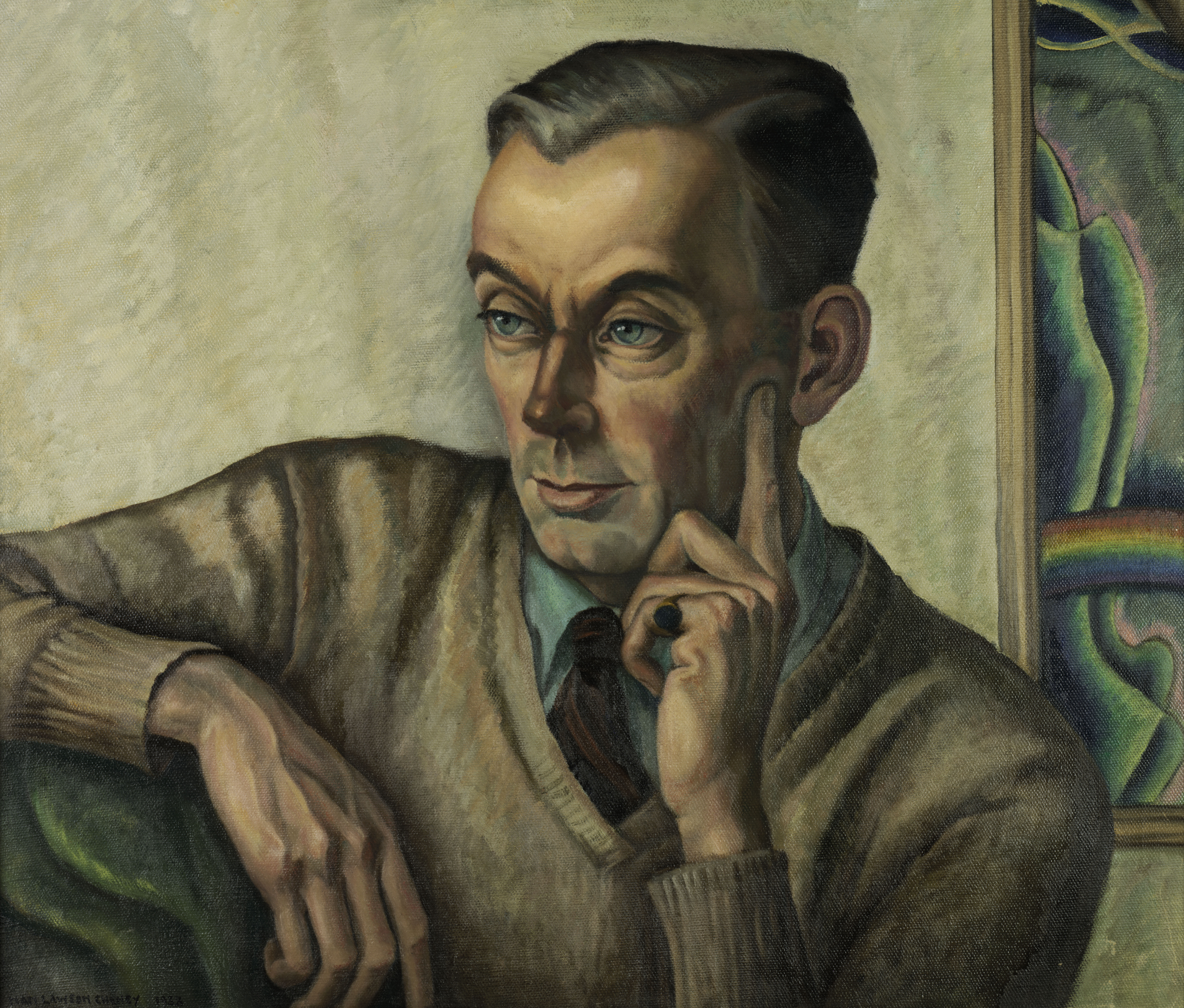
Nan Cheney, Portrait of Jock MacDonald, 1938. BC Archives, PDP05729.
