= Graham Forsythe =

Canadian artist (1952–2012)

- Born: Basil Graham Forsythe; October 17, 1952; Ballymena, County Antrim, Northern Ireland
- Died: March 16, 2012 (aged 59); Florida, U.S.
- Occupation: Painter

Basil Graham Forsythe (17 October 1952–16 March 2012) was a Canadian artist. Although Forsythe was classified blind at birth he traveled extensively. He did not start painting until 1991 when his eyesight was restored by an operation.

== Early life ==
Forsythe was born in Ballymena, County Antrim, Northern Ireland. In 1958 Forsythe and his family immigrated to Canada. He worked his way through University and graduated with a degree in Political Science from the University of Guelph in Ontario. He completed his formal education in 1974 at the age of 22.

== Career ==
In 1981 Forsythe started his own business paving roads. His company employed a dozen workers and the work was steady, but Forsythe had a desire to do something more creative.

In his spare time Forsythe wrote murder mysteries, perhaps prompted by the fact that his father and his father's brothers were all policemen working in homicide. As a young boy Forsythe would overhear his father speaking about unsolved crimes with colleagues.

At the age of 38 Forsythe was told that an operation might be able to give him sight. Despite the risk of complications, Forsythe chose to undergo the operation. Fortunately, the operation was a success and Forsythe could see properly for the first time. Inspired by the beauty of nature, Forsythe began to paint. His talent was evident and soon art galleries and private collectors began to purchase his landscapes and seascapes.

Graham Forsythe was a member of the Federation of Canadian Artists and won several Jurors Choice Awards. Most of Forsythe's paintings depict natural scenes.

He died in March 2012 in Florida, aged 59, while preparing for an exhibition there.

== Honors and awards ==
- 1998 'Juror's Choice Award', Federation of Canadian Artists
- 1999 'Juror's Choice Award', Federation of Canadian Artists
- 2000 'Juror's Choice Award', Federation of Canadian Artists
- 2006 Selected Featured Artist, Ladera Ranch Education Foundation annual fundraising event.

== Publications ==
- International Artist Magazine Edition #61 USA, 2008
- International Artist Magazine Edition #56 USA, 2007
- Monterey County Weekly, Monterey, California, USA (2002)
- Ballymena Guardian, Ballymena, Northern Ireland (2003)
- Art World News, National Publication, USA (2003)
- International Graphics, Eggenstein, Germany (2004)
- Ladera Ranch Herald, Ladera Ranch, California, USA (2004)
- Galleries West Magazine, Calgary, Alberta, Canada (2005)
- Cottage Style Magazine, National Publication, USA (2006)
- Orange Coast Magazine, Orange County, California, USA (2006)
- MagazinArt Biennial, National Publication, Canada (2006)
- Pierre Belvedere Cards, Quebec, Canada (2006)
- International Graphics, Eggenstein, Germany (2006)
