= Harry Heine =

Canadian artist (1928–2004)

Harry Heine R.S.M.A. (July 24, 1928 – September 25, 2004) was an artist who specialized in maritime scenes.

== Life and work ==
Heine was born in Edmonton, Alberta, Canada. He lived in Victoria, British Columbia, Canada until his death in 2004.

His career as an artist spanned forty years. He was a member of the Royal Society of Marine Artists, to which he was elected the only Canadian member in 1980. He was a Vice President of the Canadian Society of Marine Artists and of the Federation of Canadian Artists. He was made an Honorary Citizen of the City of Victoria in 1985 and an Honorary Alberta Artist in 1983 in recognition of his contribution to the Visual Arts. He was also a member of the Northwest Watercolour Society.

His work is in many public collections including the Legislative Buildings of the Government of British Columbia; Washington State Arts Commission Collection; Captain Cook Birthplace Museum, England; Mystic Seaport Museum, United States; The Provincial Maritime Museum, B.C.; Government House Collection, B.C.; The Mendel Art Gallery, Saskatchewan; Edmonton Art Gallery and the Alberta Art Foundation.

He painted murals for Expo '86 in Vancouver, Syncrude Canada, the Royal Canadian Legion in Edmonton and the towns of Vegreville, Fort Saskatchewan, Chemainus and Chetwynd. Painting commissions include the Canada I Society (America’s Cup), Telecom Canada, H.M.C.S. Malahat, the Government of B.C. and Beautiful British Columbia Magazine. Other works range from carved murals and ship models to posters and book illustrations. He was made a Life Member of the Sail & Life Training Society and the Vintage Vessel Registry.

Heine shared his techniques through demonstrations, workshops and classes throughout Western Canada and overseas as guest lecturer for P&O Lines’ Swan Hellenic Cruises. From 1986 to 2004 he conducted private painting tours to varied locales in Europe, Asia and North America. His co-host on many of those trips was teacher and watercolourist, his elder daughter Caren Heine. His son Mark is an illustrator and fine artist and his youngest daughter Jennifer is an artist and graphic designer. All three children have been involved in gallery exhibitions with their father, including major retrospectives held at Winchester Galleries in June 2005 and 2007. A further Canadian Legacy exhibition added a third generation, as it included photography by Sarah Heine, Mark's younger daughter. It was held in May 2017 at the MacMillan Arts Centre in Parksville, BC.

== Bibliography ==
- A Celebration of Marine Art, Royal Society of Marine Artists
- Who's Who in American Art
- Who's Who in Art
- Dictionary of International Biography
- Who's Who in the West

== Articles ==
- Five Artists and the Sea, Sea Magazine. Frances Dayee, auth.
- On the Water’s Edge, Skyward Magazine.
- Harry Heine’s Voyage of Discovery, Western Living Magazine. Betty Gibbs, auth.
- A Suitcase of Sketches, Boulevard Magazine.
- Of Wind, Sea and Sail, Art Impressions Magazine, Christine Gardner, auth.
- Charting a Course of Discovery, Maturity Magazine. Alison Gardner, auth.
- Smithsonian Magazine. Stan Meisler, auth.
- Beautiful British Columbia Magazine.
- Editorial: Arts West Magazine. Carolyn Lieir, Editor.
