= Naan (disambiguation) =

Naan is an Asian flatbread.

Naan may also refer to:

- Naan (1967 film), Indian drama
- Naan (2012 film), Indian thriller
- Gustav Naan (1919–1994), Estonian physicist and philosopher
- Na'an, a kibbutz near Rehovot, Israel

== See also ==
- Nan (disambiguation)
