= Janina Buzūnaitė-Žukaitienė =

Lithuanian artist and poet

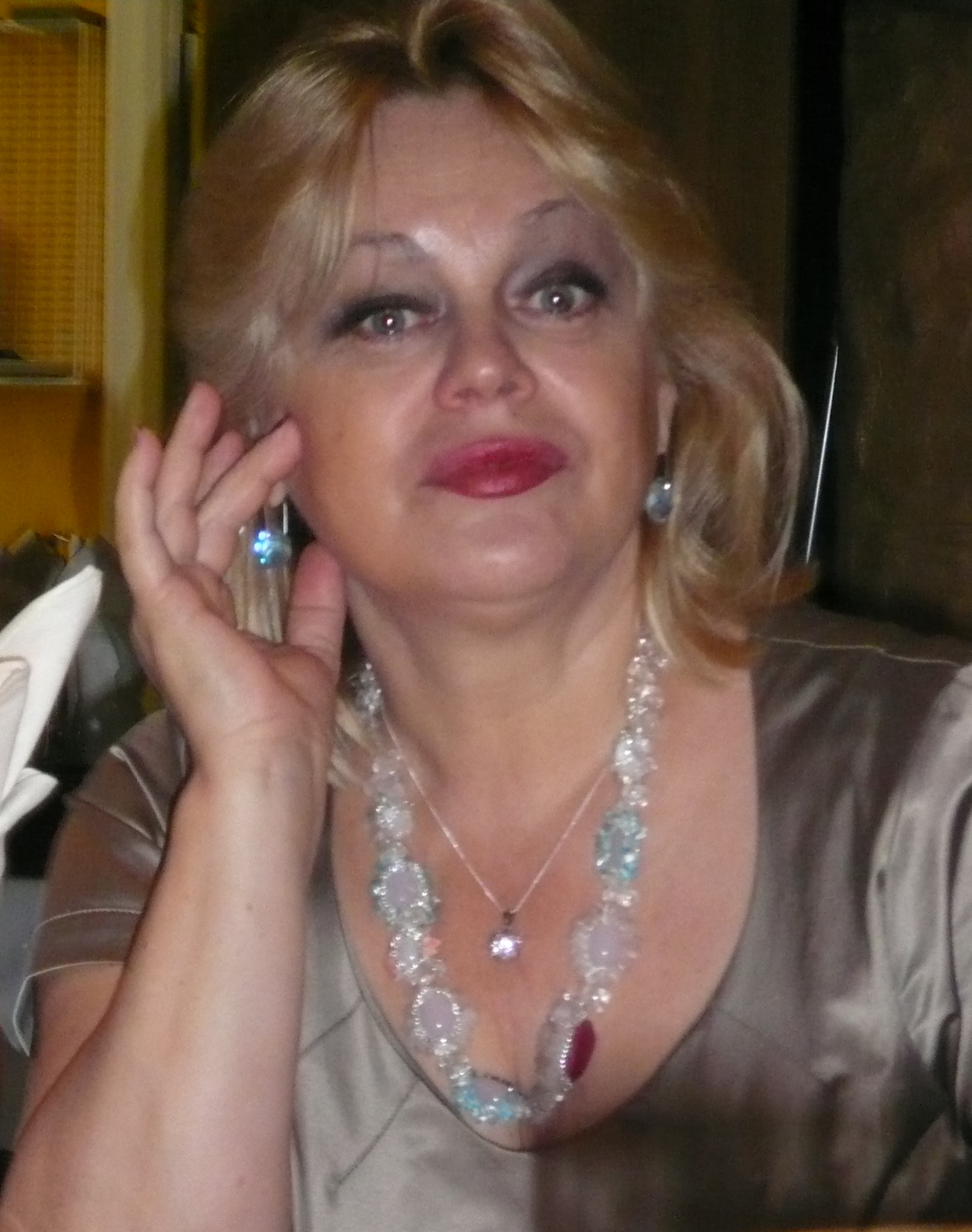
- Born: 17 July 1955 (age 70); Daugai, Soviet Union (now Lithuania)
- Occupation(s): painter, poet, accessories and metal sculptures creator.

Janina Buzūnaitė-Žukaitienė (born July 17, 1955, in Daugai, Lithuania) is a Lithuanian painter, poet, creator of accessories and metal sculptures. She is a member of the Federation of Canadian Artists (FCA) since 2000. Abstract themes are dominant in the artist's work, and expressionism is felt throughout all her paintings. The author's poems are mostly influenced by neo-romanticism and modern rhyming techniques. Regarding fashion accessories, they are massive but with close attention to detail – giving them a sense of social status.

== Early life ==
Buzūnaitė-Žukaitienė's ancestors were minor aristocrats. However, when she was around ten, her parents' house burned down, so she spent many years living with her relatives. The artist left home when she was sixteen and started studying to become a librarian because of her love for books. In 1978, she began working in the House of Culture of Medvilne. At this time, her poems started being published in newspapers and used in national and international events. The artist also tried her skills in commercial photography and business.

== Artist's career ==
As art critic Rasa Sarkauskaite (2000) has noted, Buzūnaitė-Žukaitienė entered the Lithuanian art world unexpectedly. The paintings were full of temperament and not bound by any rules – they did not follow art school rules. Art critics compared her work to the well-known Georgia O'Keeffe who was painting at the beginning of the 20th century. Especially, the similarities are seen in the painting collection Cactuses, the same synthesis of erotic, poetic and strong colour motives. Another art critic Romualdas Alekna (2001) referred to the artist as a phenomenon defined by Ignacy Witz in his book The Great Self-Taught Artists (1961). Romualdas Alekna (2005) also stressed that Buzūnaitė-Žukaitienė never repeats herself, there are no repetitive motives – just all original work. Furthermore, painting's composition is well balanced with abstract and figurative details.

== Paintings, publishing ==
Since 1999 the author has had 30 individual exhibitions in Alytus, Druskininkai, Kaunas, Vilnius. The most significant ones were:

- 1999 Baltos Varnos Salonas, Alytus. (White Crown Salon)
- 2000 Lietuvos dailininkų sąjunga, Vilnius. (Lithuanian Artists' Association)
- 2001 Medaliu Galerija, Vilnius. (Gallery of Medals)
- 2002 Lietuvos Seimas, Vilnius. (Lithuanian Parliament)
- 2003 Alytaus Teatras, Alytus. (Alytus Theatre)

The paintings are held in private collections around the world: Lithuania, Poland, Russia, Latvia, Denmark, Canada, the USA, United Kingdom, Ireland, Spain, Japan and others.
