= Nan Thuzar Win =

Burmese politician

Member of the Kayin State Hluttaw
- Incumbent
- Assumed office 3 February 2016
- Constituency: Kawkareik Township № 1

Personal details
- Born: 25 August 1981 (age 44) Kayin State, Myanmar
- Party: National League for Democracy
- Parent: Aye Win (father)

Nan Thuzar Win (Burmese: နန္းသူဇာဝင္း, also spelt Nang Thuzar Win; born 25 August 1981) is a Burmese politician who currently serves as a deputy speaker of Kayin State Hluttaw and a member of parliament in the Kayin State Hluttaw for Kawkareik Township № 1 Constituency. She is a member of the National League for Democracy.

== Early life ==
Nan was born on 25 August 1981 in Kayin State, Myanmar. She graduated with L.L.B. Her previous job is attorney .

== Political career ==
In the 2015 Myanmar general election, she contested the Kayin State Hluttaw from Kawkareik Township № 1 parliamentary constituency. She is currently serves as deputy speaker of Kayin State Hluttaw .
