= Byllee Lang =

Canadian sculptor (1908–1966)

Evelyn Fay "Byllee" Lang
- Born: 4 December 1908; Didsbury, Alberta, Canada
- Died: 3 December 1966 (aged 57); Bermuda
- Occupation: Sculptor
- Known for: Reredos, Anglican Cathedral, Bermuda

Evelyn Fay "Byllee" Lang (4 December 1908 – 3 December 1966) was a Canadian sculptor who spent the last twenty years of her life in Bermuda.

== Early years ==
Evelyn Fay "Byllee" Lang was born near Didsbury, Alberta, on 4 December 1908. Her father was a rancher, and she grew up at ease handling a rifle and riding a horse. She studied at the Winnipeg School of Art (WSA) from 1926 to 1930, and paid her way by painting people's pets. She became interested in sculpture, which was not taught at the WSA at that time. She therefore moved to the Ontario College of Art in Toronto and studied under Emanuel Hahn (1881–1957). She gained commissions to make sculptures of the pet dogs of wealthy women in Toronto, and used her savings to travel to Europe.

== Europe ==
Lang studied for two years in Munich, Germany, and visited other European cities. When Adolf Hitler took power she was living in Berlin, where she was greatly upset by the anti-Semitic activities of the Nazis. In Paris she met Alphonso de Marin, from Barcelona, and they moved to Palma, Majorca where they married and settled down. On the eve of the Spanish Civil War Lang returned to Canada, while de Marin joined the Spanish Red Cross. She never heard from her husband again.

== North America ==
Lang's ability was soon recognized after her return to Winnipeg. Her work was exhibited in eastern Canada and with the Manitoba Society of Artists (MSA). Despite recognition, she had difficulty making a living. In 1936 Lang founded the deMarin School of Sculpture in Winnipeg, where she taught both children and adults. In 1940 she was elected a full member of the MSA. She was drawing students away from the Winnipeg School of Art, which invited her to join the faculty and move her studio there. Lang was an inspiring teacher, and the move proved good for her and for the school. However, at the end of 1943 the WSA decided that there were not enough students to justify the sculpture class, and Lang lost her job.

In 1942 Lang became convenor of the Manitoba Regional Group of the Federation of Canadian Artists (FCA). At the first meeting of the Federation in Toronto in May 1942 she said in an interview, "The isolation of artist in western Canada has been practically a disease." In 1942 the FCA endorsed a project by Lang for a collaborative mural in the United Services Centre of Winnipeg. Lang won commissions to make sculptures of leading Canadians. She worked for a while at the National Film Board in Ottawa. She made an acclaimed bas-relief called Coal Miner, on the basis of which she was given employment in Montreal by the Canadian National Railway. Lang moved to New York for a period. There she made a bust of the African-American playwright Owen Dodson (1914–1983).

== Bermuda ==
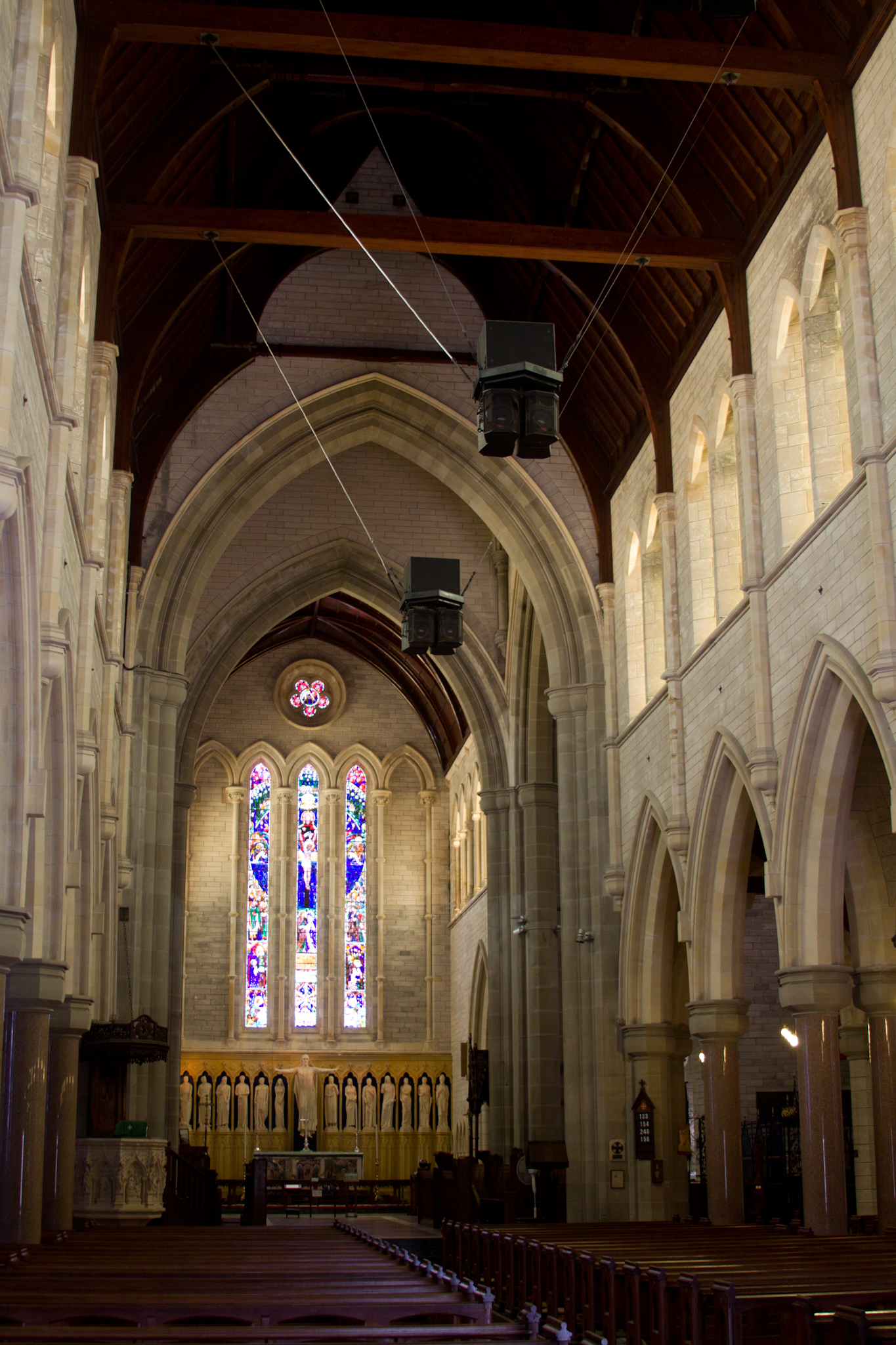
Interior of the Bermuda cathedral. Reredos is below the stained glass windows.

In 1945 Lang moved to Bermuda, which would be her home for the rest of her life. She rented studio space from Sir Gilbert Cooper and his brother Arthur on the second floor of their department store, and worked for them as a window dresser. In 1948 she began to teach children sculpture and clay at the new school of the Bermuda Art Association. She joined the Bermuda Society of Arts and worked on productions of the Bermuda Musical and Dramatic Society, where she helped design and make sets and costumes. She moved her studio three times, each time teaching racially integrated classes, even though other schools in Bermuda were segregated at the time.

In 1958 Lang was given a commission to create the reredos for the Anglican Cathedral, which would consist of an altar screen, a statue of Christ and statues of fourteen saints. Her statue of Christ was installed and dedicated in July 1962. Smaller statues of the Virgin Mary and the saints Anne, Andrew, Brendan, John, Luke and Paul were installed before the end of the year. However, the project ran into delays, overruns in cost and controversy about Lang's decision to use local people as models. She took a break from the stress and went to Mexico. There it was found that she had breast cancer, and she had a mastectomy.

Lang returned to Bermuda and continued to work on the reredos, where individual donors paid for two more statutes. She was overweight, smoked and drank. She died on 3 December 1966 of a heart attack following gall bladder surgery, and is buried at St. John's Church in Pembroke, Bermuda. Her Bermudan friend Andrew Trimingham wrote that she was "the godmother of every artistic endeavour going." According to her student and assistant Carlos Dowling, "She truly did not see color."

== Work ==
Lang was skilled in modeling and had the ability to capture the personality of the subjects of her portraits. In Winnipeg her work included heads of Edith Carter, an instructor at the School of Art, Marcus Hyman, a lawyer and Paddy Stone, a choreographer. Lang's work in Bermuda included a bust of the carriage driver Davy Douglas, exhibited in Toronto in 1952, a bust of Rudy Commissiong, leader of the Esso Steel Band, and a dolphin for the pool at the Horizons And Cottages resort. In 2008 the Bermuda National Gallery staged an exhibition called A tribute to the late Byllee Lang. She has been called a "bedrock realist" and "one of the leaders of a rugged, honest school of Canadian sculpture."

== Sources ==
- Baker, Marilyn (1989-01-01). "BYLEE FAY LANG". The Winnipeg School of Art: The Early Years. Univ. of Manitoba Press. ISBN 978-0-88755-386-8.
- Baker, Marilyn (2006). "The Later Years: Women Instructors at the Winnipeg School of Art in the 1940s". Atlantis. 30 (2).
- Bumsted, J. M. (1999). "Byllee Fay Lang (1908–1966)". Dictionary of Manitoba Biography. Winnipeg: University of Manitoba Press.
- Ebbin, Meredith (2014). "Evelyn Fay "Byllee" Lang". Bermuda Biographies. Archived from the original on 2014-08-12.
- Huneault, Kristina; Anderson, Janice (2012-04-11). Rethinking Professionalism: Women and Art in Canada, 1850–1970. McGill-Queen's Press – MQUP. ISBN 978-0-7735-3966-2.
- "National Gallery extends its cultural reach". Bermuda Sun. January 23, 2008.
