= Robert Genn =

Canadian artist (1936–2014)

- Genn on location at Lake of the Woods, Ontario
- Born: Robert Douglas Genn; May 15, 1936; Victoria, British Columbia, Canada
- Died: May 27, 2014 (aged 78); Surrey, British Columbia
- Known for: Painter

Robert Douglas Genn (May 15, 1936 – May 27, 2014) was a Canadian artist, who gained recognition for his style, which is in the tradition of Canadian landscape painting. He ran a painters' website, which sends out twice weekly newsletters to 135,000 artists. In 2005, Genn campaigned against the Chinese website arch-world.com, which was selling thousands of high-resolution images of around 2,800 artists' work illegally without permission. He succeeded to an extent.

== Life and work ==
Robert Genn was born in Victoria, British Columbia to an English mother and a Scottish father. He studied at Victoria College and the University of British Columbia, then in 1958 at the Art Centre School in Los Angeles. He painted landscapes throughout British Columbia, Manitoba, Ontario, New Mexico, and Western Europe.

He identified with and has been compared to the 1920s Canadian Group of Seven. In 1961, he met Lawren Harris who was a neighbour in Point Grey, Vancouver. Genn had problems with painting skies, and Harris's advice was to turn the picture upside-down: "Paint down from the trees to the clouds at the bottom of the picture to get the perspective right." Genn said this was "valuable advice", which enabled him "to control the gradation and work up into the trees in a more abstract manner." He was a practitioner of plein air painting, and he liked to set his easel in the same spot as his predecessors, such as J. E. H. MacDonald in the Canadian Rockies.

Genn ran the Painter's Keys website, a worldwide artists' community, with his staff and volunteers. The web site sends out a free twice-weekly newsletter, which is sent to 135,000 artists in over 100 countries, and claims the largest collection of art quotes online with over 5,382 authors quoted. His "Ten Commandments of Art Pricing" on his web site (reprinted on About.com) advise starting cheaply, raising prices slowly, keeping them the same for all purchasers and pricing by size.

In 2005, Genn campaigned against the Chinese website arch-world.com, which was selling thousands of high-resolution images of around 2,800 artists' work illegally without permission. After failing to gain support from the Canadian government or the Chinese embassy in Ottawa, Genn used his web site to enlist subscribers' support to email objections to the arch-world, resulting within days in over 1,000 online complaints from artists, dealers and politicians to the company and governments. This stimulated a diplomatic protest letter to the Chinese Ministry of Commerce, Trading and Law Department from the Canadian Embassy in Beijing. Genn credited the campaign with the subsequent removal of images by 800 Canadian artists from the arch-world, although many works were reinstated on arch-world soon after.

Genn was a member of the board of directors at Emily Carr College of Art & Design. In 2006, a retrospective of his work, consisting of 16 paintings sourced from across Canada, was held at the Surrey Art Gallery.

Genn announced in his Twice-Weekly Letter of 25 October 2013 that he had been diagnosed with pancreatic cancer. He died at his Surrey, British Columbia home at 10:20 am on 27 May 2014 according to his daughter Sara Genn in the Twice-Weekly Letter of 30 May 2014. Several months after his death, four galleries across Canada held honorary openings of his work.

== Books ==
Genn wrote three books. In Praise of Painting (2012) is an illustrated autobiography of his early years. The Dreamway (1987) is an account of a meeting with a spiritual seer. The Painter's Keys (2000) is a handbook for painters based on one of his creativity seminars.

== Representation and collections ==
As of early 2020, 621 works have had auction sales. His work is represented by 12 galleries in Canada. Solo shows include Jenkins Showler Gallery, White Rock; West End Gallery, Edmonton; Hambleton Galleries, Kelowna, The Art Emporium, Vancouver; and Canada House Gallery, Banff, AB. He was one of the 60 elected senior members (SFCA) of the Federation of Canadian Artists (FCA).

His work is in corporate and public collections, including Air Canada, Bank of Montreal, Canadian General Insurance, Canadian Airlines, Canadian Utilities, The Churchill Corporation, Expo '86, Esso Resources, First City - California II, Highfield Oil & Gas, Molson Brewery Ltd., Montreal Trust, Shell Resources, University of Alberta, Westgate Chevrolet, and the Government of Belgium.
