= Nan Cuz =

Guatemalan-German painter (1927–2019)

Nan Cuz (born Irmgard Cuz Heinemann; 6 January 1927 – 11 November 2019) was a German–Guatemalan painter.

== Life ==
Nan Cuz was born in 1927 in Secoyocte, in the municipio of Senahú in Alta Verapaz, Guatemala. Her mother was Q’eqchi' Maya, her father German. While she was growing up with her mother and grandmother in the traditional Mayan way, her father returned to Germany and married there. When Cuz was seven years old, her German stepmother traveled to Guatemala to take her back to Germany to provide her with an education. Although the original agreement was that she would be returned to her mother when she completed her schooling, World War II and its aftermath prevented this.

Her father was an accomplished photographer and taught her the craft, but she soon moved on to painting portraits.

Cuz died at the age of 92 on 11 November 2019 in Panajachel, Guatemala.

== Artistic work ==
The indelible impressions of her childhood – the glowing, shining power of the sun, the close relation with animals, with the always fragrant vegetation, and last but not least with her mother – had left Cuz with a longing that demanded expression. Scenes and colors of her native land were deeply imbedded in her psyche and appeared to her in dreams and visions, which she began to express in her art in 1950. Cuz created scenes in which motifs from the world of myths and legends from everyday Mayan life dominate.

She used various techniques, including relief painting and screen printing in works characterized by intense colors. Her interest in world religions, especially in the Maya cosmovision and Buddhism, is particularly evident in her later works, which deal principally with spiritually inspired subjects.

From 1957 Cuz had exhibitions at numerous European sites, including the Museum der Völkerkunde, Hamburg (1960), Übersee-Museum, Bremen (1961), Stenzel Gallery, Munich (1961), Meyers Art Gallery, Esbjerg (1963), and Galerie Commeter, Hamburg (1965).

In 1968 Cuz' and Georg Schäfer's book In the Kingdom of Mescal was published, an illustrated fairy tale for adults based on indigenous Guatemalan folklore. It rapidly attained cult status within the hippie movement and was later translated into several languages.

== Publications ==
- Die Geburt der Sonne. Indianermärchen aus Lateinamerika. Nacherzählt von Harri Findeisen. Illustriert von Nan Cuz. Union Verlag, Stuttgart 1985, ISBN 3-8139-5623-7.
- In the Kingdom of Mescal: A Fairy-tale for Adults. Georg Schäfer (Author), Nan Cuz (Illustration). Translated by Dinah Livingstone. Macdonald, London 1969 (DNB 579583201).
- Nan Cuz. Magia y Emociones. Fundación Paiz para la Educación y la Cultura, Ciudad de Guatemala, 2017, ISBN 978-9929-8132-6-7.
- Indianische Malerei von Nan Cuz. Kunsthalle Rostock, Rostock 1968

== Filmography ==
- Brennende Feder. Sehendes Herz – Nan Cuz, eine deutsch-indianische Malerin. Production/Regie: Anja Krug-Metzinger, Radio Bremen/Arte, 2008
- Blazing Feather. Discerning Heart. – Nan Cuz. A German-Indian Painter, documentary film about Nan Cuz by Anja Krug-Metzinger
