= Royal Society of Marine Artists =

English association promoting contemporary marine art

The Royal Society of Marine Artists (RSMA) is an association of artists in London, England, that promotes contemporary marine art. This includes painting, drawing, printmaking and sculpture.

== History ==
The Royal Society of Marine Artists was founded in 1939. This came about after some initial exhibitions on the subject, staged "largely due to the anomaly that Great Britain, whose history is so bound up with the sea, did not have a society dedicated to painting the sea and its occasions." One of these early exhibitions, Sea Power, gained the patronage of King George VI and was opened by Winston Churchill. Subsequently, in 1938, Admiral of the Fleet, the Earl of Cork and Orrey suggested the formation of a formal society, which came into being with the title "The Society of Marine Artists".

No activity took place immediately because of the outbreak of World War II, and it was not until 1946 that the Society's inaugural exhibition was mounted in the Guildhall Art Gallery at the invitation of the City of London Corporation. This became the venue for the Society's annual exhibitions. In 1966, Queen Elizabeth II granted assent for the title of "The Royal Society of Marine Artists". The location for the annual exhibitions was changed to the Mall Galleries in 1981, when building works prevented use of the Guildhall.

The Society maintains links with other relevant organisations, including the National Maritime Museum, the Royal Navy, the Royal National Lifeboat Institution and with publishers and the shipping industry. In 1996, Blandford published a 176-page book A Celebration of Marine Art : Fifty Years of the Royal Society of Marines Artists. In 2004, the Society exhibited work at the National Maritime Museum.

Norman Wilkinson (1878–1971) was a member, as was Harry Heine (1928–2004) the first Canadian to be elected. Leslie Arthur Wilcox (1904–1982) was Honorary Secretary from 1960 to 1974.

The society is a registered charity. It is also one of the nine member societies that form the Federation of British Artists, which is based in and administers the Mall Galleries, next to Trafalgar Square. Approximately 50 full members are entitled to use the letters R.S.M.A. after their name.

== Officers ==
- Elizabeth Smith, PRSMA (President)
- Geoff Hunt, VPRSMA (Vice President)
- Margaret Heath RSMA (Hon. Secretary)
- Bruce Mulcahy RSMA (Hon. Treasurer)

== See also ==
- Federation of British Artists
