= Nan Song =

Nan Song may refer to:

- Southern Song (1127–1279), the second period of the Song dynasty
- Song Nan (born 1990), Chinese figure skater surnamed Song
- Nan Song (footballer) (born 1997), Chinese association footballer surnamed Nan
