= Georg Schäfer (artist) =

German painter

- Born: Georg Johannes Schäfer; March 25, 1926; Leinefelde, Germany
- Died: January 11, 1991 (aged 64); Chatham, Massachusetts
- Education: University at Fulda
- Spouse(s): Nan Cuz (Imgard Carmen Heinemann), Sherry Munson

Georg Johannes Schäfer (March 25, 1926 – January 11, 1991) also known by the pseudonym Oma Ziegenfuss, was a German painter, poet, and author who lived in Guatemala and the United States.

== Early life and wartime activities ==
Schäfer was born in 1926 in Leinefelde, Germany.

According to Schäfer's account, at the age of 12 he was pressured into joining the Hitler Youth. In 1943 he was stationed in Denmark with the occupation forces, where he became a member of the Danish resistance, under the leadership of Damgaard Hansen. While working with the resistance, Schäfer was betrayed, captured by the Gestapo, found guilty of espionage, and sentenced to death. He was jailed for six months while awaiting execution. He was twice placed in front of firing squads in an effort to coerce him into betraying members of the resistance, which he refused to do. Aged 17, he started a hunger strike.

On March 16, 1945, Heinrich Himmler commuted his death sentence to 15 years in prison. Schäfer's father had been writing to the prison, asking for his son's release, though it is unclear what effect this had. When the Allied Forces liberated Berlin, Schäfer had worked 18 months hard labor in Grabow, Mecklenburg, Germany.

== Post-war ==
After the war, Schäfer entered the Theological College at Fulda Hessen, but decided against a career in the Catholic Church. He was invited to accompany a group of Romani people who had also been interned in concentration camps, and traveled with them for two years. In 1947, he returned to Fulda. Unable to finance university studies, he began to write instead, completing his autobiography and submitting articles to various publications. On April 18, 1950, he sent the manuscript of his autobiography to Albert Schweitzer. That same year, he was given a position at the weekly newspaper Die Zeit. Now employed, he entered the University at Fulda to study philosophy and the natural sciences.

=== LSD and mescaline research ===
Through his studies, reportage, and his interest in human science, Schäfer met Albert Hofmann, who synthesized LSD. They worked together on experiments with LSD and mescaline. While under the influence of synthetic mescaline, Schäfer experienced the same vision that he had as a child as a reaction to severe burns on his abdomen. Inspired by his experiences with psychoactive substances, Schäfer painted prolifically, painting over 100 illustrations, and wrote the fairytale In the Kingdom of Mescal.

In 1951, Schäfer began corresponding with a number of doctors, including Professor H. Bender and Dr. Hubert Urban. Their correspondence led to an invitation in 1953 for Schäfer to work on experiments with mescaline and consciousness in dreams at the University Clinic of Psychiatry and Neurology in Innsbruck, Austria. His findings were published in September 1953 in a psychiatric journal, Oesterreich, on the subject of "The Problem of Time and Space".

=== Preservation of cultures ===
The publication of his article raised Schäfer's profile within the psychological community. He sent the article to Carl Jung and Albert Einstein, corresponding with both although never meeting either. In 1952, Schäfer wrote about the systematic destruction of Mahayana Buddhism within the Mongolian Territories of the Soviet Union. Through the research and publication of these articles, Schäfer began correspondence with Nyanaponika Mahathera in Sri Lanka and Lama Anagarika Govinda, a Mayahana Buddhist monk, which continued for the next thirty years.

Schäfer and his second wife, who he called Mani, travelled to Sri Lanka and later to Guatemala where they settled amongst the Mayans. Over time, Schäfer became increasingly concerned about the destruction of the Mayan culture by the "boots of progress". In 1989, the Schäfers and their three children moved to Chatham, Massachusetts. By this time Schäfer had adopted the pseudonym Oma Ziegenfuss in all aspects of life.

The move to Massachusetts was difficult for Schäfer, who felt isolated after living in the communal culture of Guatemala. His health was poor during his initial months in the United States, and he suffered a heart attack 18 months after the move. After his recovery, he prepared a successful exhibit in Seattle, Washington. Upon returning to Chatham, on January 11, 1991, he had a second heart attack, which killed him the same day.

== Personal life ==
As a reporter for Die Zeit, he met Imgard Carmen Heinemann (also known as Nan Cuz), a photographer of German and Mayan descent. They reported on several assignments together and married on December 23, 1950.

In 1979 he met Sherry Munson in Santa Fe, New Mexico, whose family owned the Munson Gallery. They traveled to Sri Lanka with the intention of repainting the Buddhist temple of Nyaniponika Mahathera. Their first child was born in Sri Lanka. The couple had two more children in Guatemala and a fourth child in the United States, who they named after Lama Govinda.
