= Nan Peete =

American Episcopal Priest ordained in 1984

The Reverend Nan Peete
- Born: 1938 (age 86–87); Chicago, Illinois
- Occupation: Episcopal priest
- Organization: Episcopal Church USA

Nan Arrington Peete (born 1938) is an American Episcopal priest. She was ordained in 1984 and, among other postings, she was the rector at All Saints' Church in Indianapolis and a staff member of Trinity Church in New York City. In 1988, she was invited by the Archbishop of Canterbury, Robert Runcie, to speak at the Lambeth Conference, a gathering of Anglican bishops that usually occurs every 10 years. She was the first ordained woman to ever address the conference and her speech is credited by some as having helped increase support of the ordination of women in the Anglican Communion.

== Early life ==
Nan Arrington was born in Chicago, Illinois, in 1938. Her father, Maurice Arrington, was a civil engineer and worked in Michigan, traveling back and forth to Chicago on weekends. Her mother, Phoebe Clanton Arrington, was a teacher. Her parents were both Episcopalians and Arrington was raised in the church. Arrington attended the University of Chicago Laboratory School, graduating in 1955.

After graduating high school, she married Robert Peete in 1960. They had two children together, Richard and Valerie. The family moved to the Los Angeles area in 1970, where Arrington attended Occidental College, graduating with a BA in economics in 1975. She then completed a Master of Arts degree in human resource management from the University of Redlands in 1978. She worked for several years for Coopers and Lybrand Accounting Firm as a management consultant.

== Ministry ==
Peete decided to enter the Christian ministry. In 1984, she completed her master's degree in divinity (MDiv) from the General Theological Seminary in New York City. She was ordained as a priest in the Episcopal Church the same year. She served as the curate for St. Mark's Episcopal Church in Upland, California, for one year, before becoming the rector of All Saints' Church in Indianapolis, Indiana, in 1985. In addition to ministry in her parish, she was involved in ministry to the homeless and helped launch the Dayspring Center Emergency Shelter. In 1985, Peete also attended the inaugural conference on Afro-Anglicanism, held in Barbados.

In 1989, Peete moved to the Episcopal Diocese of Atlanta, to serve as the canon to the ordinary. She served in this role until 1994. She oversaw training of new clergy, parish assignments for priests, and the ordination process for ordinands in the diocese.

In 1994, Peete joined the staff of Trinity Church, an historic Episcopal church on Wall Street in New York City. She served there as the Associate for Pastoral and Outreach ministries for five years. In 1995, she was the keynote speaker at the second Afro-Anglican conference held in Cape Town, South Africa.

From 1999 to 2003, Peete served in the Diocese of Southern Ohio as the canon for ministry. In 2003, she became the canon for deployment and ordination in the Diocese of Washington. She preached at the National Cathedral in Washington, D.C., on February 29, 2004. She has served on the National Ministries Unit and the Inclusiveness and Justice Standing Committee for the National Council of Churches of Christ, USA.

Peete retired in 2005.

== Lambeth Conference ==
In 1988, Peete was invited to speak at the Lambeth Conference by the then-Archbishop of Canterbury, Robert Runcie. The Lambeth Conference is a gathering of bishops from across the Anglican Communion and is usually held every 10 years. Discussion of the role of women in the Anglican Communion was a major topic at the 1988 Lambeth Conference. The issue of the ordination of women to the priesthood was particularly controversial; some bishops were strongly opposed and others strongly supported women's ordination. The Episcopal Church in the United States had begun ordaining women as priests in the 1970s. Women's ordination was also accepted in the Anglican Church of Canada and the Anglican Church in Aotearoa, New Zealand, as well as some Anglican churches in provinces of Asia and Eastern Africa. In the Church of England, however, as well as some other Anglican churches in the global communion, women's ordination had not been approved. The Episcopal Church was moving forward to consecrate their first woman bishop, a move that was opposed by more conservative bishops.

Peete was the first female Anglican priest to ever address the Lambeth Conference. She spoke on July 22, which was the feast day of St. Mary Magdalene. She was the last of four speakers on the topic of women's ordination. Three bishops proceeded her in speaking on the topic. Michael Peers, Archbishop and Primate of the Anglican Church of Canada, spoke about the experience of his own church since the approval of women's ordination. Graham Leonard, the Bishop of London, a well-known and outspoken opponent of women's ordination, spoke after Peers; he summarized his opposition. Samir Kafity, Bishop of Jerusalem, spoke third; he urged charity and deliberation in deciding the matter. As the final speaker of the group, Peete shared reflections on her life as a young black girl in the United States and how she had encountered exclusion in some settings because of race and gender. She affirmed that she had been sustained by the church's teachings of equality. She expressed her belief that women priests helped to embody this message of equality, and that ordaining women would strengthen the church. After Peete ended her speech, she received a standing ovation. Her speech has been noted as being one of the more memorable moments of the conference, and is considered to have inspired more bishops to support women's ordination.
