= Federation of Canadian Artists =

Arts association

- Formation: 1941; 85 years ago
- Type: Arts association
- Legal status: Charity
- Purpose: Public voice, education and network
- Headquarters: Vancouver, BC, Canada
- Region served: Canada
- Members: Over 3,000
- Official language: English, French
- Website: www.artists.ca

The Federation of Canadian Artists (FCA) is an association of artists in Canada founded in Toronto in 1941. The FCA soon had chapters across the country, and was one of the main forces behind formation of the Canada Council in 1957. After this, the national organization withered, and only the British Columbia chapter remained active. A drive for expansion began in 1977, causing a renewal of activity that started in western Canada and then spread. Expansion stalled out in the late 1990s when funding cuts hit the Federation as hard as it hit other arts organization. Renewed vigor by volunteers and staff in recent years has brought new life to the Federation and expansion is again underway. The organization has about 2,700 paying members and 5,000 artist contacts throughout Canada as of the end of 2017, a permanent gallery in Vancouver, and organizes approximately 44 exhibitions every year.

== Foundation ==
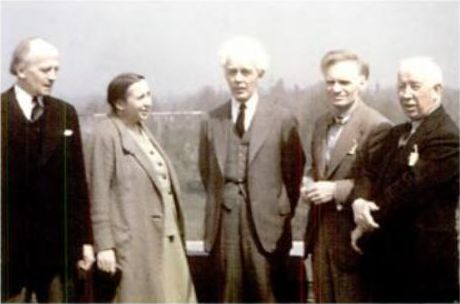
Leaders of the Federation of Canadian Artists at a meeting in Toronto in May 1942. From left to right Arthur Lismer, Frances Loring, Lawren Harris, André Charles Biéler, A. Y. Jackson

André Charles Biéler organized the first conference of Canadian artists in 1941. This conference, held in Kingston, Ontario, led to the foundation of the Federation of Canadian Artists. At his opening address at the Kingston conference Bieler insisted that "we should not try to unify ourselves or to attempt to make a school that would cover the whole country. On the contrary, I believe we must keep that regional aspect." The Federation of Canadian Artists was founded in Toronto by a group of Canadian artists. Biéler was the first president.

The Federation was divided into regions, each with a regional organizer. Lawren Harris of the Group of Seven was head of the West Coast region. The other organizers were Gordon Sinclair (Western region), Ernest Lindner (Saskatchewan), Byllee Lang (Manitoba), A. Y. Jackson (Ontario) and Walter Abell (Maritimes).

== Goals ==
Writing in Maritime Art (February–March 1943) Arthur Lismer proposed that the goals of the Federation were to improve understanding of the role of artists in society, to encourage youth while supporting established artists and to bring art to the community. The FCA became a powerful national lobby for public patronage of the arts, recognized as the legitimate representative of Canadian artists. J. Delisle Parker wrote in February 1945, "This is not just another art society, nor is it intended to replace any existing art society. It is an organization formed to unite all the artists in Canada, whether member of existing societies or not, in a federation which it is hoped will become a power in the country. The Federation hopes to bridge the isolation of artists in different parts of the country, discover talent and organize regional as well as country-wide activities and to publish an art magazine to serve the interests of art and artists in the country as a whole..."

== History ==
Walter Abell's journal Maritime Art became Canadian Art in 1943 when Abell moved to Ottawa to join the staff of the Art Centre of the National Gallery of Canada. The Federation sponsored Canadian Art, which was the only national art magazine in the 1940s. Canadian Art became an important vehicle for communication between artists, curators and collectors. In June 1944 the Federation and other national art organizations prepared a brief on cultural aspects of Canadian post-war reconstruction. This led to the formation of the Canadian Arts Council. The FCA was a key member of the Canadian Arts Council after it was founded in 1944. At first the FCA sponsored lectures and plays in addition to exhibitions and workshops. After about 1949 it began to focus on the visual arts.

The FCA made a major presentation to the Royal Commission on National Development in the Arts, Letters and Sciences, the Massey Commission, in Vancouver in 1949. The presentation was instrumental in forming the Canada Council, which came into being in 1957. The FCA began to phase itself out as a national organization after this as communication across Canada became easier. By the 1960s there was little activity at the national level, although the regional branches persisted. In British Columbia there were 600 members.

In 1977 Allan Edwards of the Vancouver branch, by now almost all that was left of the FCA, became president and began a drive for expansion. The FCA organized travelling exhibitions in British Columbia and Alberta, with some going to the east of Canada or the USA. In the 1980s the FCA began to organize annual painting seminars on Saltspring Island, which drew students from across western Canada and the USA.

in 2013, due to chronic underfunding from any level of government, the FCA went through another revitalization under Executive Director Patrick E. Meyer. Services were expanded as was the Federation's geographical reach. Membership numbers doubled and the organization became financially self-sufficient for the first time in its history.

The Federation Gallery is a full time gallery at 1241 Cartwright Street, Vancouver, BC having regular bi-weekly shows both promoting and selling artworks of their FCA Members and occasionally public online showings.

== Noted members ==
- Sid Barron (1917–2006)
- Robert Bateman (born 1930)
- André Charles Biéler (1896–1989)
- Miller Brittain (1912–1968)
- Janina Buzūnaitė-Žukaitienė (born 1955)
- Emily Carr (1871-1945)
- Charles Comfort (1900–1994)
- Albert Edward Cloutier (1902–1965)
- Rody Kenny Courtice (1891–1973)
- Graham Forsythe (1952-2012)
- A. Y. Jackson (1882-1974)
- Robert Genn (1936–2014)
- Lawren Harris (1885–1970)
- Harry Heine (1928–2004)
- Alma Duncan (1917-2004)
- Arthur Lismer (1885–1969)
- Frances Loring (1887–1968)
- Neil Patterson (born 1947)
- Dorothy Stevens (1888–1966)
- Roy Henry Vickers (born 1946)

== Sources ==
- "André Charles Biéler". The Canadian Encyclopedia. Historica Canada. 2008.
- Brison, Jeffrey (2005-12-01). Rockefeller, Carnegie, and Canada: American Philanthropy and the Arts and Letters in Canada. McGill-Queen's Press – MQUP. ISBN 978-0-7735-2868-0.
- Cochran, Bente Roed (1989-01-01). Printmaking in Alberta, 1945–1985. University of Alberta. p. 2. ISBN 978-0-88864-139-7.
- "History". Federation of Canadian Artists.
- Lerner, Loren R.; Williamson, Mary F. (1991-01-01). Art and Architecture in Canada: A Bibliography and Guide to the Literature. University of Toronto Press. ISBN 978-0-8020-5856-0.
- Parker, J. Delisle (10 February 1945). "Art For All: FCA, Looking Ahead, Would Draw Dominion Into One Great Cultural Venture – Dominion Government will be Invited to Set Aside $10,000,000 to assist communities to build art centres" (PDF). Vancouver Province: 2. Archived from the original (PDF) on 2019-04-20.
- Poole, Ellen (2008). "65 years of Artistic Achievement: A History of the FCA" (PDF). FCA. Archived from the original (PDF) on 2019-04-20.
- Smith, Frances K. (2006). Andre Bieler: An Artist's Life and Times. Presses Université Laval. ISBN 978-1-55407-232-3.
