= Zhang Nan =

Zhang Nan, Zhāng Nán, or Nan Zhang may refer to:

- Zhang Nan (Three Kingdoms) or Wenjin (張南, died 222), Shu Han general
- Nan Zhang (actress) (張南, born 1986), Chinese-American actress
- Zhang Nan (gymnast) (張南, born 1986), Chinese gymnast
- Zhang Nan (cyclist) (張南, born 1989), Chinese cyclist
- Zhang Nan (badminton) (張南, born 1990), Chinese badminton player
- Zhāng Nán, better known as Kelly Zhang (張南), CEO of ByteDance China
