= Wang Nan =

Wang Nan may refer to:

- Wang Nan (judoka) (born 1970), Chinese judoka
- Wang Nan (sport shooter) (born 1978), male Chinese sports shooter
- Wang Nan (table tennis) (born 1978), female Chinese table tennis player
- Wang Nan (baseball) (born 1981), Chinese baseball player
- Wang Nan (speed skater) (born 1987), Chinese male speed skater
- Wang Nan (ice hockey) (born 1988), Chinese female ice hockey player
- Wang Nan (canoeist), Chinese female canoeist
