= George Ziegenfuss =

American basketball coach

George Ziegenfuss (September 26, 1917 – December 2, 2007) was the head men's basketball coach at San Diego State University from 1948 until 1969.

== Playing career ==
Born in Centerville, Wisconsin, Ziegenfuss was a three-year letterman for the Washington Huskies. He was an All-Pacific Coast Conference player in 1939, when the Huskies finished 20–5 under coach Hec Edmundson.

== Coaching career ==
Ziegenfuss was the winningest and longest-tenured head coach for the San Diego State Aztecs men's basketball team, serving from 1948 until 1969. He compiled 316 wins during his tenure, winning five conference championships. He died on December 2, 2007, in San Diego, California. He was inducted into the Aztecs Hall of Fame in 1994.
