= Neal Patterson =

American businessman (1949–2017)

- Patterson in 2012
- Born: December 10, 1949; Anthony, Kansas
- Died: July 9, 2017 (aged 67)
- Occupation: Businessman
- Known for: CEO of Cerner

Neal L. Patterson (December 10, 1949 – July 9, 2017) was an American businessman who was CEO of Cerner Corporation, a Kansas City-based medical software corporation. Patterson was also owner of the Sporting Kansas City soccer team.

== Early life ==
Patterson grew up on the family farm in South Central Kansas near Manchester, Oklahoma, and received bachelor's and master's degrees from Oklahoma State University in 1971 and 1972. Following a stint with Arthur Andersen, he and Arthur Andersen colleagues Cliff Illig and Paul Gorup founded Cerner in 1979.

== Military service ==
Patterson served in the Army National Guard during Vietnam, though only served on active duty during basic training.

== Management ==
Patterson was featured in the USA Today article titled "Scandals lead execs to Atlas Shrugged" as a member of a group of CEOs who have a working knowledge of Ayn Rand's Atlas Shrugged. He became a member of the Pi Kappa Alpha fraternity at Oklahoma State University.

Patterson is infamous for an email scolding managers for not coming to work before 8 am and leaving before 5 pm, now a prominent example used when discussing email netiquette. On the day that the email was posted to Yahoo!, the company's market cap fell by over 22% from a high of US$1.5 billion.

In April 2010, Forbes named Patterson fourth on its annual list of "America's Best-Performing Bosses" based on a formula for calculating which executives delivered the best shareholder value relative to their total compensation. Factors included stock performance relative to industry peers over the past six years, annualized stock performance during the leader's total tenure and performance relative to the S&P 500 over that time, and total compensation over the past six years.

== Sporting Kansas City ==
On August 31, 2006, Patterson and five others purchased Sporting Kansas City (then known as the Kansas City Wizards), a Major League Soccer team, from Lamar Hunt. The other members of the ownership group at the time of purchase were Cliff Illig, Rock Island Capital’s Robb Heineman, Greg Maday, David French, and Pat Curran, founder of C3 Holdings. The group stated its intention to keep Sporting Kansas City in the Kansas City area.

== Death ==
Patterson died on July 9, 2017, from complications from soft-tissue cancer, which was diagnosed in January 2016 and that he had been previously treated for.
