= List of members of the League of Women Voters =

Below are notable members of the League of Women Voters

- Juanita Jones Abernathy (1931–2019), member of the board of directors of the Atlanta Fulton County League of Women Voters
- Sadie L. Adams (1872–1945), one of the first women to serve on an election board in Chicago and one of the founders of the Alpha Suffrage Club
- Jessie Daniel Ames (1883–1972), suffragist and civil rights leader from Texas who helped create the anti-lynching movement in the American South and who founded the Texas League of Women Voters and served as its first president until 1923
- Ida Reid Blair (Mrs. John Blair) (1874–1930), Chairman of the Publicity Section of the New York State Woman Suffrage Party and member and chair of the board of directors of the Equal Franchise Society.
- Florence Fifer Bohrer (1877–1960), first female senator in the Illinois General Assembly. Served on the National League of Women Board and was the Illinois branch President.
- Inez Mee Boren (1880–?), president of the Northern (California) Section
- Woodnut S. Burr (1861–1952), president of the Los Gatos Branch
- Becky Cain (194?–), former organization president
- Carrie Chapman Catt (1859–1947), founder
- Frances St John Chappelle (1897–1936), State president of the Nevada League of Women Voters
- Edith Chase (1924–2017), served as president from 1965 to 1967
- Shirley Chisholm (1924–2005), first African-American woman in Congress
- Ruth Clusen (1922–2005), an American conservationist, politician, civil rights activist, and government official. She is remembered for serving as the president of the League of Women Voters, for hosting the debates between Jimmy Carter and Gerald Ford, and for serving as the Assistant Secretary of Energy under President Jimmy Carter
- Belle Christie Critchett (1868–1956), an American social activist and suffragist who was part of the Texas Equal Suffrage Association (TESA) and president of the El Paso chapter of the League of Women Voters; she worked with suffragist Maude E. Craig Sampson to increase opportunities for Black women voters
- Minnie Fisher Cunningham (1882–1964), first executive secretary and a founding member of the Woman's National Democratic Club
- Naomi Deutsch (1890–1983), early member and the organizer and director of the Public Health Unit of the Federal Children's Bureau of the Department of Labor of Washington, D.C.
- Dorothy W. Douglas (1890–1968), social reformer who chaired the League's campaign for legislation in 1930.
- Janet Stuart Oldershaw Durham (1879–1969), charter member of the Virginia League of Women Voters
- Lillian Feickert (1877–1945), American suffragist (president of the New Jersey Woman Suffrage Association from 1912 to 1920) who was the first woman from New Jersey to run for United States Senate and who helped organize the New Jersey League of Women Voters
- Nan B. Frank (1886–1980), very active in League of Women Voters of California and president of the San Francisco Center of California League of Women Voters
- Edith Jordan Gardner (1877–1965), member of the Oakland Forum
- Edna Fischel Gellhorn (1878–1970), one of the founders and original vice president
- Betty Gilmore, founder and president of the California Women of Golden West
- Ione Grogan (1891–1961), member of the Greensboro League of Women Voters
- Harriet A. Haas (1874–19??)
- Alice Rogers Hager (1894–1969), corresponding secretary, D.C. League of Women Voters, 1926–27; president, Women's National Press Club
- Jessie Jack Hooper (1865–1935), American peace activist and suffragist, who was the first president of the Wisconsin League of Women Voters
- Ethel Edgerton Hurd (1845–1929), physician, social reformer and leader in the woman's suffrage movement in Minnesota
- Fanny M. Irvin (1854–1949), drafted a resolution to Congress which was passed by the State Legislature, endorsing Woman's Suffrage, and lobbied for the passage of the Constitutional Amendment
- Carolyn Jefferson-Jenkins (1952–), first woman of color to serve as president of the League of Women Voters and the only one in the first hundred years of the League.
- Birdie Robertson Johnson (1868–1926), suffragist, and clubwoman
- Florence Kelley (1859–1932), a social and political reformer active in NAWSA and instrumental in founding the League of Women Voters, the National Consumers League and the NAACP.
- Dorothy Kenyon (1888–1972), lawyer, judge, and political activist
- Julia Lathrop (1858–1932), director of the United States Children's Bureau from 1912 to 1922, originator of the ideas for the Sheppard-Towner Act, and chosen president of the Illinois League of Women Voters in 1922.
- Percy Maxim Lee (Mrs. John G. Lee) (1906–2002), president of the League of Women Voters from 1950 to 1958, supporter of international cooperation, and opponent of Joseph McCarthy.
- Katharine Ludington (1869–1953), one of the founders and last president of the Connecticut Woman Suffrage Association.
- Katharine Du Pre Lumpkin (1897–1988), sociologist and author of The Making of a Southerner and books on workers and child labor.
- Deirdre Macnab (1955–), women's rights and voting rights activist. She is former president of the League of Women Voters of Florida (LWVFL).
- Jane Y. McCallum (1877–1957), women's suffrage and Prohibition activist and longest-serving Secretary of State of Texas.
- Ruth Hanna McCormick (1880–1944), headed the Congressional Committee of the National American Woman Suffrage Association 1913–1915, elected as an at-large member of the US Congress in 1928.
- Maybelle Stephens Mitchell (1872–1919), co-founder of the Georgia League
- Maud Wood Park (1871–1955), African-American suffragist and corresponding secretary of the Alpha Suffrage Club
- Achsa E. Paxman (1885–1968), Utah State Legislature member, president of a State chapter
- E. Jean Nelson Penfield, co-founder, League of Women Voters
- Leonora Pujadas-McShine (1910–1995), women's rights activist, founder of Trinidad and Tobago chapter
- Edith Dolan Riley (1885–1967), chairman of the Spokane County Democratic Central Committee
- Margaret Zattau Roan (1905–1975), oversaw League activities in nine Southern states in 1930s
- Julie Roland, naval officer, lawyer, and columnist
- Eleanor Roosevelt (1884–1962), first lady of the United States 1933–1945 and board member of the New York State League of Woman voters
- Zelia Peet Ruebhausen (1914–1990), United Nations observer appointed 1946, member of several federal policy committees
- Belle Sherwin (1869–1965), woman's rights activist
- Orfa Jean Shontz (1876–1954), early attorney
- Virginia Kase Solomón, CEO of the League of Women Voters of the United States; current President of Common Cause
- Mary Jane Spurlin (1883–1970), first woman judge in Oregon
- Helen Norton Stevens (1869–1943), treasurer
- F. Josephine Stevenson, State Chairman of Uniform Laws of the National League of Women Voters (1920–21).
- Ursula Batchelder Stone (1900–1985), chaired the Cook County League of Women Voters (1941 to 1944)
- Fay Webb-Gardner (1885–1969), First Lady of North Carolina
- Reah Whitehead (1883–1972), prepared the Drafts of Bills for and assisted in procuring passage of laws for Women's State Reformatory and Filiation Proceedings
- Wilhelmine Wissman Yoakum (1891–1983), treasurer of the California League of Women Voters
- Valeria Brinton Young (1875–1968), member of the League and president of the Women of the University of Utah
- Irene Herlocker-Meyer, environmental activist
