= Alliance for Justice =

Progressive judicial advocacy group

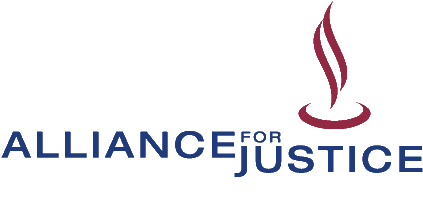
- Abbreviation: AFJ
- Formation: August 7, 1974; 52 years ago
- Type: 501(c)(3) nonprofit organization
- Tax ID no.: 52-1009973
- Headquarters: Washington, D.C.
- Chair: Paulette Meyer
- Revenue: $4.95 million (2024)
- Expenses: $9.27 million (2024)
- Endowment: $17.1 million
- Website: afj.org

The Alliance for Justice (AFJ) is a progressive judicial advocacy group in the United States. Founded in 1979 by Nan Aron, AFJ monitors federal judicial appointments. AFJ represents a coalition of 135 politically liberal groups that have an interest in the federal judiciary. The Alliance for Justice presents a modern liberal viewpoint on legal issues.

== Judicial advocacy ==
AFJ launched the Judicial Selection Project in 1985 to monitor the federal judicial appointment system. According to AFJ's founder, Nan Aron, the organization wanted to guard against the ideological impact of Ronald Reagan's federal judicial nominees. AFJ objects to judicial nominees who oppose abortion or who promise to exercise judicial restraint. The organization provides background on prospective nominees to the American Bar Association and the Senate Judiciary Committee.

AFJ played a role in the defeat of Ronald Reagan nominee Robert Bork's nomination to the Supreme Court of the United States in 1987. In 2001, the organization supported the nomination of Roger Gregory, a Bill Clinton nominee and the first African-American judge in the Fourth Circuit in 2001. In 2013, AFJ supported President Barack Obama's three nominees for the United States Court of Appeals for the District of Columbia Circuit.

== Member organizations ==
AFJ reports a membership of over 130 organizations. As of 2025, member groups include:

- Advancement Project
- Advocates for Youth
- AIDS United
- Alliance for the Great Lakes
- Americans for Financial Reform
- Autistic Self Advocacy Network
- Bazelon Center for Mental Health Law
- Bend the Arc
- Beyond Toxics
- CenterLink
- Center for Constitutional Rights
- Center for Reproductive Rights
- Center for Science in the Public Interest
- Compassion & Choices
- Disability Rights Education and Defense Fund
- Drug Policy Alliance
- Earthjustice
- Equal Rights Advocates
- Equality Federation
- Faith in Action
- Food & Water Watch
- Free Press
- Friends of the Earth
- Human Rights Campaign Foundation
- Innocence Project
- International Center for Research on Women
- Jobs with Justice
- Juvenile Law Center
- Lambda Legal
- Lawyers' Committee for Civil Rights Under Law
- League of Conservation Voters Education Fund
- MAZON: A Jewish Response to Hunger
- Mexican American Legal Defense and Educational Fund
- Mi Familia Vota
- Move to Amend
- National Abortion Federation
- National Association of Criminal Defense Lawyers
- National Center for Lesbian Rights
- National Center for Transgender Equality
- National Committee for Responsive Philanthropy
- National Council of Jewish Women
- National Education Association
- National Immigration Forum
- National LGBTQ Task Force
- National Parks Conservation Association
- National Partnership for Women and Families
- National Women's Law Center
- Native American Rights Fund
- Natural Resources Defense Council
- New Pennsylvania Project
- Next Up
- People's Action
- PFLAG
- Planned Parenthood Federation of America
- PolicyLink
- Race Forward
- Reproductive Freedom for All
- Rockefeller Philanthropy Advisors
- Service Employees International Union
- SIECUS
- Sierra Club Foundation
- Southern Poverty Law Center
- The Arc
- Texas Freedom Network
- Tides Center
- Transgender Law Center
- Violence Policy Center
- Younger Women's Task Force
- YWCA
