= E. Ruth Rockwood =

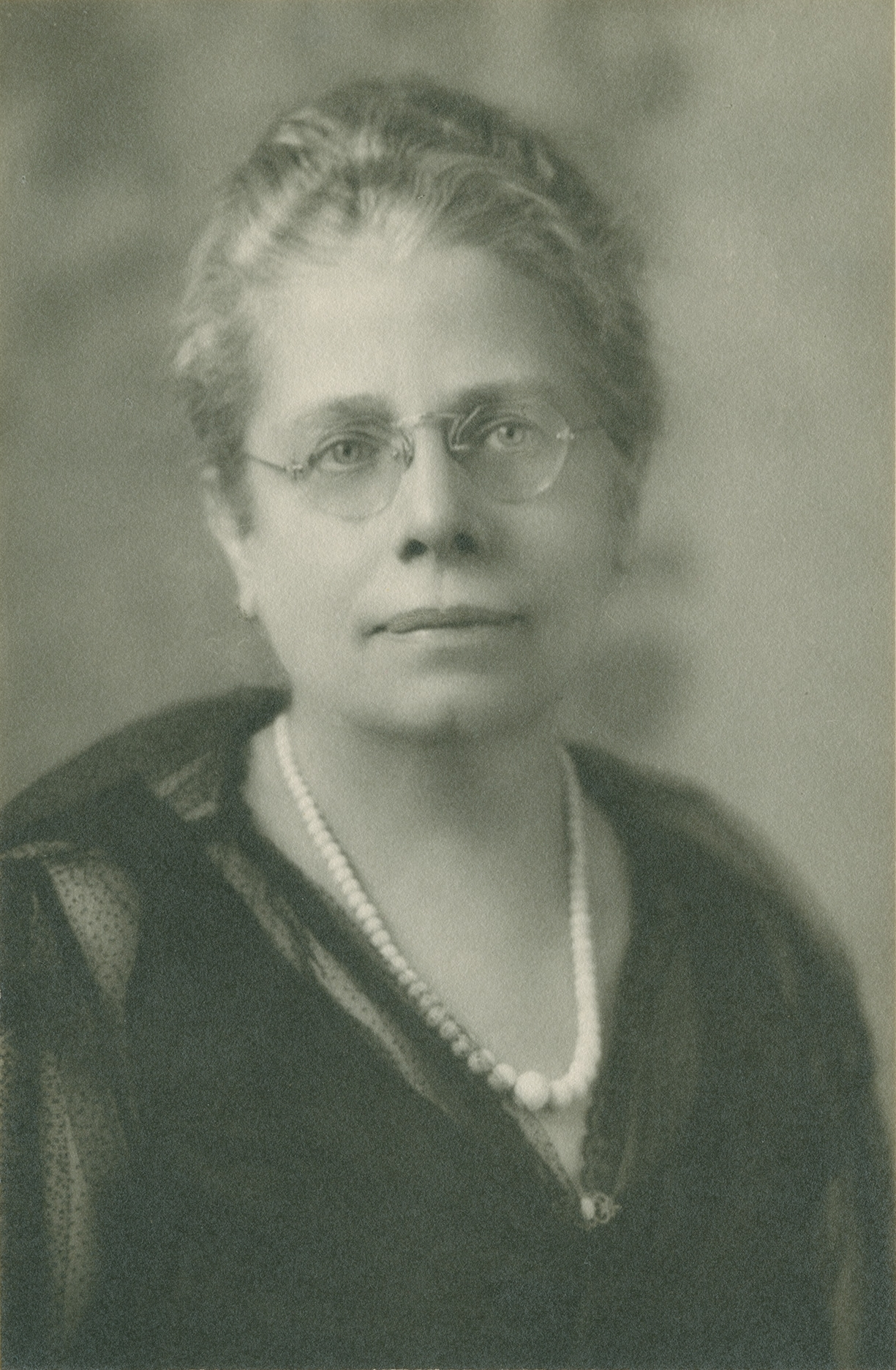
E. Ruth Rockwood

Ellen Ruth Rockwood (1872 - April 13, 1952) was an American librarian and historian.

== Career ==
Rockwood obtained a A.B. degree from Bryn Mawr College. In 1901, she joined the Library Association of Portland, and later became head of the reference department until retirement in 1938. She was a member of the American Association of University Women and of the Professional Women's League.

She contributed to the Pacific Historical Review and to the Oregon Historical Society Quarterly for which she edited Diary of the Rev. George H. Atkinson, 1847- 1858 and Letters of Charles Stevens.

Rockwood completed an exhaustive compilation of Oregon State Documents for the Oregon Historical Society, published under the title of A Checklist of Oregon State Documents.

She was in charge of the Pacific Northwest Library Association Bibliography; the original collection was built by Rockwood at the Library Association in Portland, and served as assistance to collectors and librarians of the smaller libraries.

In 1916 she was appointed chairman of the Pacific Northwest Library Association.

In December 1928 Rockwood was a charter member of the Subscription Books Committee, a group to provide evaluations and advice on encyclopedias, and subscription sets, newly founded by the American Library Association (ALA).

== Personal life ==
Rockwood was born in 1872 in Rensselaer Falls, New York. She moved to Oregon in 1886 and she lived at Alexandra Court Hotel, Portland, Oregon.

She died on April 13, 1952, and is buried at Mountain View Cemetery (Ashland, Oregon), in the Old Cemetery side, Lot 343.
