= Vinnie B. Clark =

American educator and author

- Born: Mayville, Wisconsin, U.S.
- Occupations: Educator, author
- Known for: Founding the geography department at San Diego State University
- Title: Professor of Geography
- Parent(s): Dr. Gilbert J. Clark, Elva V. Martin

Academic background
- Education: Oshkosh State Normal School
- Alma mater: University of Wisconsin–Madison

Academic work
- Discipline: Geography
- Institutions: San Diego State University
- Notable works: Europe, a geographical reader (1925)

Vinnie B. Clark (1878–1971) was an educator and author who established and developed the geography department at San Diego State University.

== Early life ==
Vinnie B. Clark was born in 1878 in Mayville, Wisconsin, the daughter of Dr. Gilbert J. Clark and Mrs. Elva V. Martin.

She graduated from the University of Wisconsin; she studied at Oshkosh State Normal School and University of Wisconsin, Madison.

== Career ==
She was an educator and author.

She moved to San Diego in 1914 and established and developed the geography department at San Diego State University. She advocated the hiring of Alvena Storm.

She traveled extensively.

She is the author of Europe, a geographical reader (1925).

She was the member of American Association of University Women, Daughters of the American Revolution, Amphion Club, Pacific Geographic Society, Pi Gamma Mu.

She resigned in 1937.

== Personal life ==
Vinnie B. Clark moved to California in 1914 and lived at New Palace Hotel, San Diego, California.

She died in 1971.
