= American Association of University Women =

Nonprofit organization

- Formation: 1881; 145 years ago
- Founders: Emily Fairbanks Talbot, Marion Talbot; Ellen Swallow Richards
- Headquarters: Washington, D.C., U.S.
- CEO: Gloria L. Blackwell
- Website: aauw.org

The American Association of University Women (AAUW) is an American non-profit organization that advances equity for women and girls through advocacy, education, and research. The organization has a nationwide network of 170,000 members and supporters, 1,000 local branches, and 800 college and university partners. Its headquarters are in Washington, D.C. AAUW's CEO is Gloria L. Blackwell.

== History ==
=== 19th century ===
In 1881, Emily Fairbanks Talbot, Marion Talbot and Ellen Swallow Richards invited 15 alumnae from 8 colleges to a meeting in Boston, Massachusetts. The purpose of this meeting was to create an organization of women college graduates that would assist women in finding greater opportunities to use their education, as well as promoting and assisting other women's college attendance. The Association of Collegiate Alumnae or ACA (AAUW's predecessor organization) was officially founded on January 14, 1882. The ACA also worked to improve standards of education for women so that men and women's higher education was more equal in scope and difficulty.

At the beginning of 1884, the ACA had been meeting only in Boston. However, as more women across the country became interested in its work, the Association saw that expansion into branches was necessary to carry on its work. Washington, D.C., was the first branch to be created in 1884, and New York, Pacific (San Francisco), Philadelphia, and Boston branches followed in 1886.

In 1885, the organization took on one of its first major projects: they essentially had to justify their right to exist. A common belief held at the time that a college education would harm a woman's health and result in infertility. This myth was supported by Harvard-educated Boston physician Dr. Edward H. Clarke. An ACA committee led by Annie Howes created a series of questions that were sent to 1,290 ACA members; 705 replies were received. After the results were tabulated, the data demonstrated that higher education did not harm women's health. The report, "Health Statistics of Female College Graduates", was published in 1885 in conjunction with the Massachusetts Bureau of Statistics of Labor. This first research report is one of many conducted by AAUW during its history.

In 1887, a fellowship program for women was established. Supporting the education of women through fellowships would continually remain a critical part of AAUW's mission.

Back in 1883, a similar group of college women had considered forming a Chicago, Illinois branch of the ACA; however, they had reconsidered and formed their own independent organization. They formed the Western Association of Collegiate Alumnae (WACA) with Jane M. Bancroft as its first president. WACA was broad in purpose and consisted of five committees: fine arts, outdoor occupations, domestic professions, press and journalism, and higher education of women in the West. In 1888, WACA awarded its first fellowship of $350 to Ida Street, a Vassar College graduate, to conduct research at the University of Michigan. In 1889, WACA merged with the ACA, further expanding the groups' capacity.

=== 20th century ===
In 1919, the ACA participated in a larger effort led by a group of American women which ultimately raised $156,413 to purchase a gram of radium for Marie Curie for her experiments.

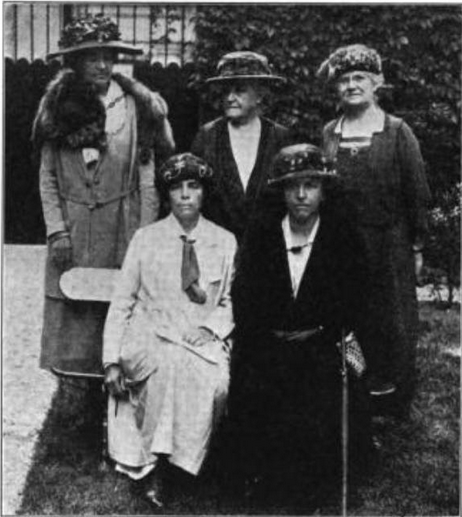
Five U.S. voting delegates at the Paris Conference, 1922

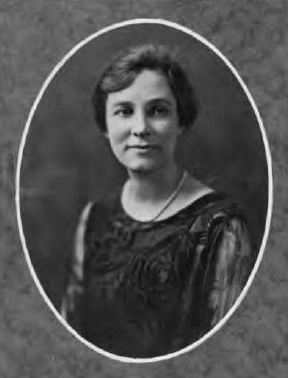
Mrs. E.E. Brownell, 1922 President of the AAUW, S.F. Bay Branch

In 1921, the ACA merged with the Southern Association of College Women to create the AAUW, although local branches continued to be the backbone of AAUW. The policy of expansion greatly increased both the size and the impact of the Association, from a small, local organization to a nationwide network of college educated women, and by 1929, there were 31,647 members and 475 branches.

During World War II, AAUW officially began raising money to assist female scholars displaced by the Nazi led occupation who were unable to continue their work. The War Relief Fund received numerous pleas for help and worked tirelessly to find teaching and other positions for refugee women at American schools and universities and in other countries. Individual branch members of AAUW also participated by signing immigration affidavits of support. During 1940, its inaugural year, the War Relief Committee raised $29,950 for distribution with 350 branches contributing.

The organization was "largely apolitical" until the 1960s. On the other hand, women in the workforce had increased to the extent that they made up 38% of workers by the end of the 1960s. Women graduating from college were looking for good employment. Membership in 1960 was at 147,920 women, most of them middle class.

== Activities ==
AAUW is one of the world's largest sources of funding exclusively for women who have graduated from college. In 2025-26, AAUW will award $5.3 million in fellowships, grants, and awards for women and for community action projects. The Foundation also funds pioneering research on women, girls, and education. The organization funds studies germane to the education of women.

The AAUW Legal Advocacy Fund (LAF), a program of the Foundation, is the United States' largest legal fund focused solely on sex discrimination against women in higher education. LAF provides funds and a support system for women seeking judicial redress for sex discrimination in higher education. Since 1981, LAF has helped female students, faculty, and administrators challenge sex discrimination, including sexual harassment, pay inequity, denial of tenure and promotion, and inequality in women's athletics programs.

AAUW sponsors grassroots and advocacy efforts, research, and Campus Action Projects and other educational programs in conjunction with its ongoing programmatic theme, Education as the Gateway to Women's Economic Security. Along with three other organizations, it founded the CTM Madison Family Theatre in 1965. AAUW joined forces with other women's organizations in August 2011 to launch HERVotes to mobilize women voters in 2012 on preserving health and economic rights. In 2011, the AAUW Action Fund launched an initiative to encourage women to vote in the 2012 election. The campaign was aimed to increase the number of votes by women and to advance initiatives supporting education and equity for women and girls.

AAUW's 2011 research report addresses sexual harassment in grades seven through 12.

AAUW's national convention is held biennially. AAUW sponsors a student leadership conference, called the National Conference of College Women Student Leaders (NCCWSL) designed to help women college students access the resources, skills, and networks they need to lead change on campuses and in communities nationwide. The student leadership conference is held annually in Washington, D.C.

Local chapters frequently host speakers who highlight a variety of topics related to women such as Molly Murphy MacGregor, a co-founder of the National Women's History Alliance.

A statement by 16 women's rights organizations including the American Association of University Women, the National Women's Law Center, the National Women's Political Caucus, Girls, Inc., Legal Momentum, End Rape on Campus, Equal Rights Advocates and the Women's Sports Foundation said that, "as organizations that fight every day for equal opportunities for all women and girls, we speak from experience and expertise when we say that nondiscrimination protections for transgender people—including women and girls who are transgender—are not at odds with women's equality or well-being, but advance them" and that "we support laws and policies that protect transgender people from discrimination, including in participation in sports, and reject the suggestion that cisgender women and girls benefit from the exclusion of women and girls who happen to be transgender."

On January 28, 2025, AAUW and over 170 other women's rights organizations issued an open letter condemning the persecution of transgender people under the second Trump administration. The letter described Executive Order 14166, which defined legal recognition of women strictly by reproductive biology and sought to restrict transgender rights, as "cruel and lawless." The organizations argued that its true intent was to stigmatize and discriminate against transgender, nonbinary, and intersex people while enforcing gender stereotypes.

== Notable members ==
- Virginia Cleaver Bacon
- C. Louise Boehringer
- Pauline Suing Bloom
- Kate Brousseau
- Esther Caukin Brunauer
- Marjorie Bell Chambers
- Frances St John Chappelle
- Vinnie B. Clark
- Lena Clauve
- Katherine M. Cook
- R. Belle Colver
- Della Prell Darknell Campbell
- Blanche Hinman Dow
- Permeal J. French
- Robin Gee
- Anne King Gregorie
- Harriet A. Haas
- Sarah Harder
- Winifred M. Hausam
- Winifred G. Helmes
- Arleen McCarty Hynes
- Reba Hurn
- Lois Carter Kimball Mathews Rosenberry
- Kate Wetzel Jameson
- Rachel Fitch Kent
- Angie Turner King
- Nancy A. Leatherwood
- Eva Frederica French LeFevre
- Lillien Jane Martin
- Lena B. Mathes
- Bernice McCoy
- Kathryn McHale (general director of AAUW, 1929–1950)
- Ruth Karr McKee
- Eva Perry Moore
- Ruth Crosby Noble
- Helen Matusevich Oujesky
- Hally Ballinger Bryan Perry
- Bernice Orpha Redington
- Cora Rigby
- Grace Taylor Rodenbough
- E. Ruth Rockwood
- Wanda Brown Shaw
- M. Elizabeth Shellabarger
- Sarah K. Smith
- Rachel Applegate Solomon
- Fanny J. Bayrhoffer Thelen
- Violet Richardson Ward
- Wilhelmine Wissman Yoakum
- Mary Yost
- Alice West Fleet

== See also ==
- List of feminist periodicals in the United States
- Younger Women's Task Force
- Irene Herlocker-Meyer
