= DCX =

DCX may refer to:

== Science and technology ==
- McDonnell Douglas DC-X, an uncrewed prototype spacecraft
- Digital customer experience
- DCX (gene), which encodes the protein doublecortin
- .dcx (DCX), a document image format, the Multipage PCX
- 610 (number) (Roman numerals)

== Other uses ==
- Dixie Chicks, an alternative-country band
- Delta Chi Xi, an honorary professional fraternity
- Brocade Communications Systems Backbone network switch

== See also ==
- DC10 (disambiguation)
