= Permeal J. French =

Idaho politician

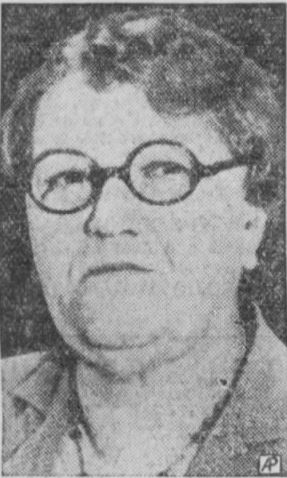

Idaho Superintendent of Public Instruction
- In office 1899–1903
- Succeeded by: Mae L. Scott

Personal details
- Born: 1867 Idaho City, Idaho, U.S.
- Died: 10 October 1954 (aged 86–87) Seattle, Washington
- Education: College of Notre Dame

Permeal J. French (1867 - October 10, 1954) was Dean of Women at University of Idaho, and the first woman elected to state-wide office in Idaho.

== Early life ==
Permeal J. French was born in Idaho City, Idaho, in 1867, the daughter of Richard G. French and Ann Lange.

In 1887, she graduated from the College of Notre Dame in San Francisco.

In 1921, she was granted an honorary degree in Master of Arts by the George Washington University.

== Career ==
Permeal J. French was Dean of Women at University of Idaho. During her time as dean, she was responsible for building the student union, and establishing the women's residence halls. After thirty years of active service she was named dean of women emeritus. She retired in 1936. The Permeal J. French House, a dormitory, was dedicated in 1954 on the campus at Moscow, Idaho.

In 1898, she won the election for Idaho Superintendent of Public Instruction, becoming the first woman to be elected to state-wide office in Idaho, just two years after women received the right to vote in Idaho. She was Superintendent of Public Instruction from 1899 to 1903; at the time it was a novelty for women to hold such offices.

She was member of the American Association of University Women and Pi Lambda Theta.

== Personal life ==
Permeal J. French lived for a time at San Francisco, California.

She died on October 10, 1954, in Seattle, Washington, and is buried at Hailey Cemetery, Hailey, Idaho.
