= Frances St John Chappelle =

American educator (1897–1936)

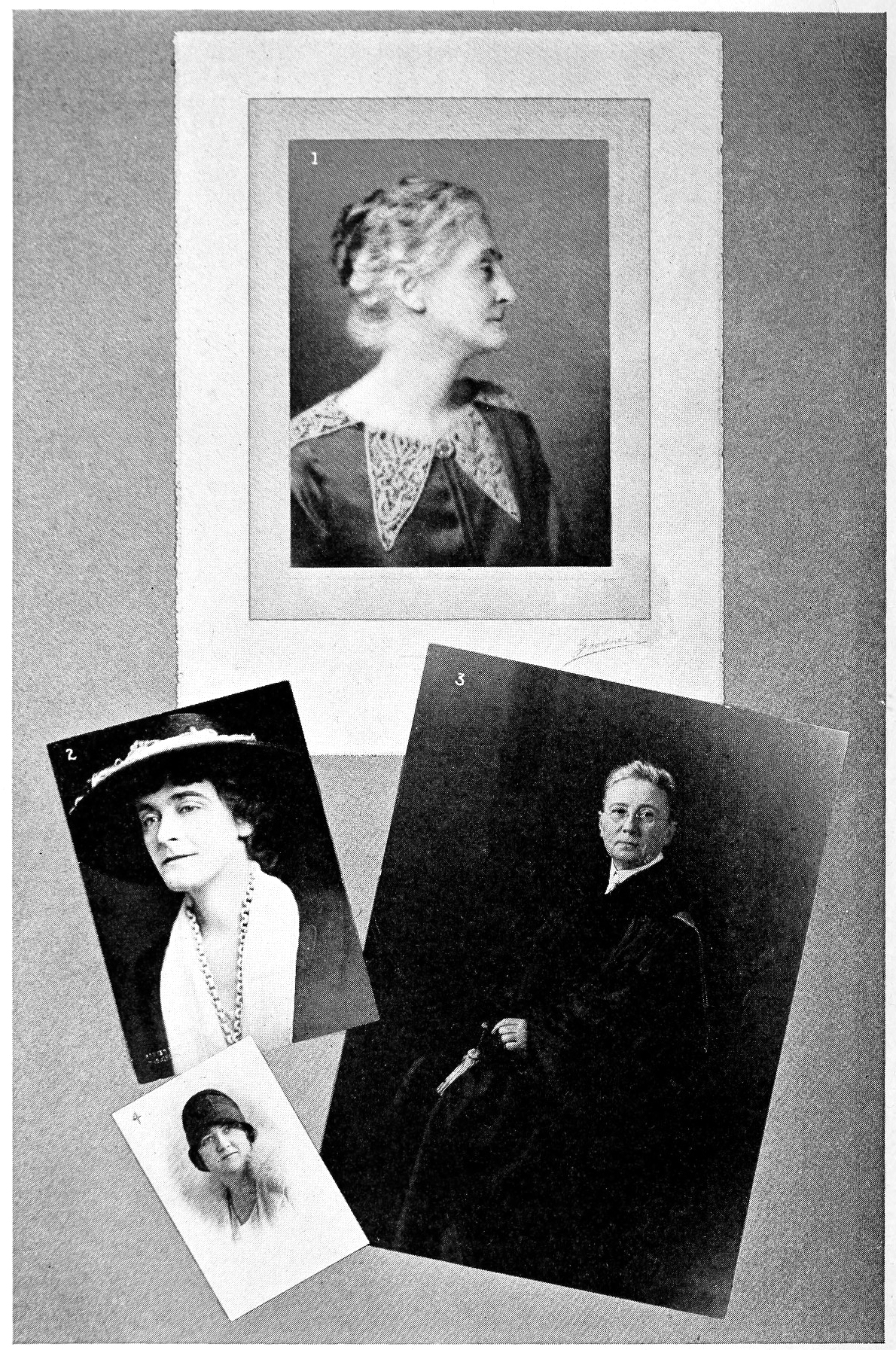
A Few of the Eminent Women of California and Nevada, Fannie Brown Patrick, Anne Jennings Kluegel, Clelia G. Mosher, Frances St. John Chappelle

Frances Arcadia Willoughby St. John Chappelle (July 2, 1897 - September 6, 1936) was an Assistant in Psychology at the University of Nevada.

== Biography ==
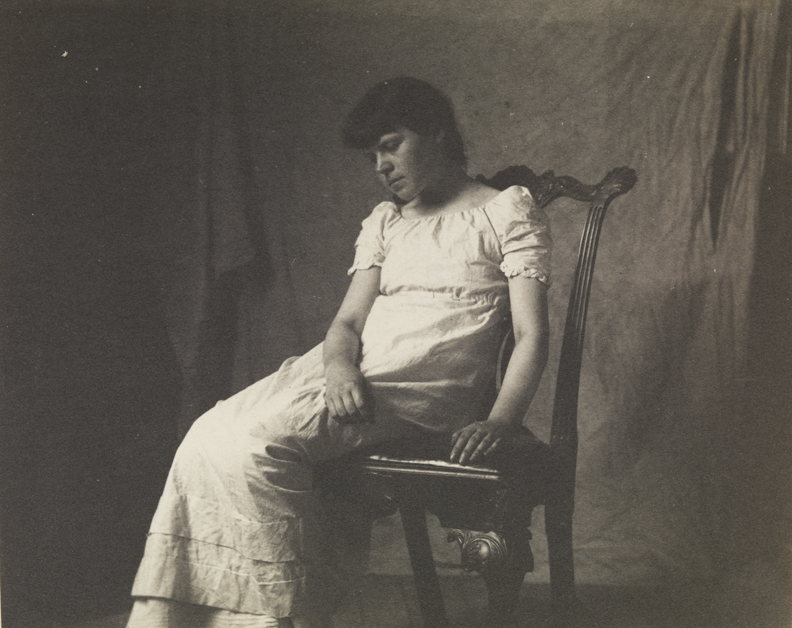
Lettie Willoughby sitting in Chippendale chair, by Thomas Eakins

Frances Arcadia Willoughby St. John was born on July 2, 1897, in Philadelphia, Pennsylvania, the daughter of Lettie Willoughby St. John, a direct descendant of the first Lord Willoughby and one of the first women to graduate from a medical college. She was also an artist and magazine illustrator.

Frances A.W. St. John graduated from Bryn Mawr College and University of Pennsylvania and took graduate work at the University of Toulouse, France, specializing in French, Psychology and Anthropology.

After graduation she joined the staff of the psychological clinic at the University of Pennsylvania.

She moved to Nevada in 1924 and lived at 576 Ridge Street, Reno, Nevada. In 1925 she married Benjamin Franklin Chappelle (1885–1948).

She was Assistant in Psychology at University of Nevada. She was State president of the Nevada League of Women Voters. She conducted private classes for the Young Women's Christian Association.

She was a member of Twentieth Century Club, League of Women Voters, American Association of University Women, Zeta Tau Alpha, Phi Kappa Phi.

Frances Chappelle died on September 6, 1936, Reno, Nevada, 5 days after the birth of her only daughter. Another daughter died at birth in 1934. She is buried at Chapel of the Chimes, Columbarium and Mausoleum Oakland, California.
