= Rachel Fitch Kent =

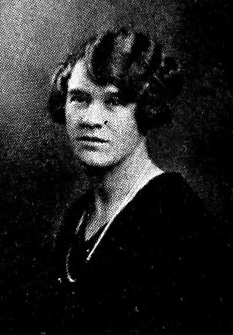
- Born: 24 November 1898; Rensselaer
- Died: 4 June 1992 (aged 93); Palm Beach
- Employer: University of Nevada, Reno (1926–1928)
- Spouse(s): Clarence H. Kent

Rachel Fitch Kent was an Instructor in English at University of Nevada.

== Early life ==
Rachel Fitch was born in Rensselaer, New York, on November 24, 1898. Her sister was Charlotte Fitch Dunshee (1901-1973), who published poems like Through the Ages, Whither Goest Thou and These Comic Verities.

== Career ==
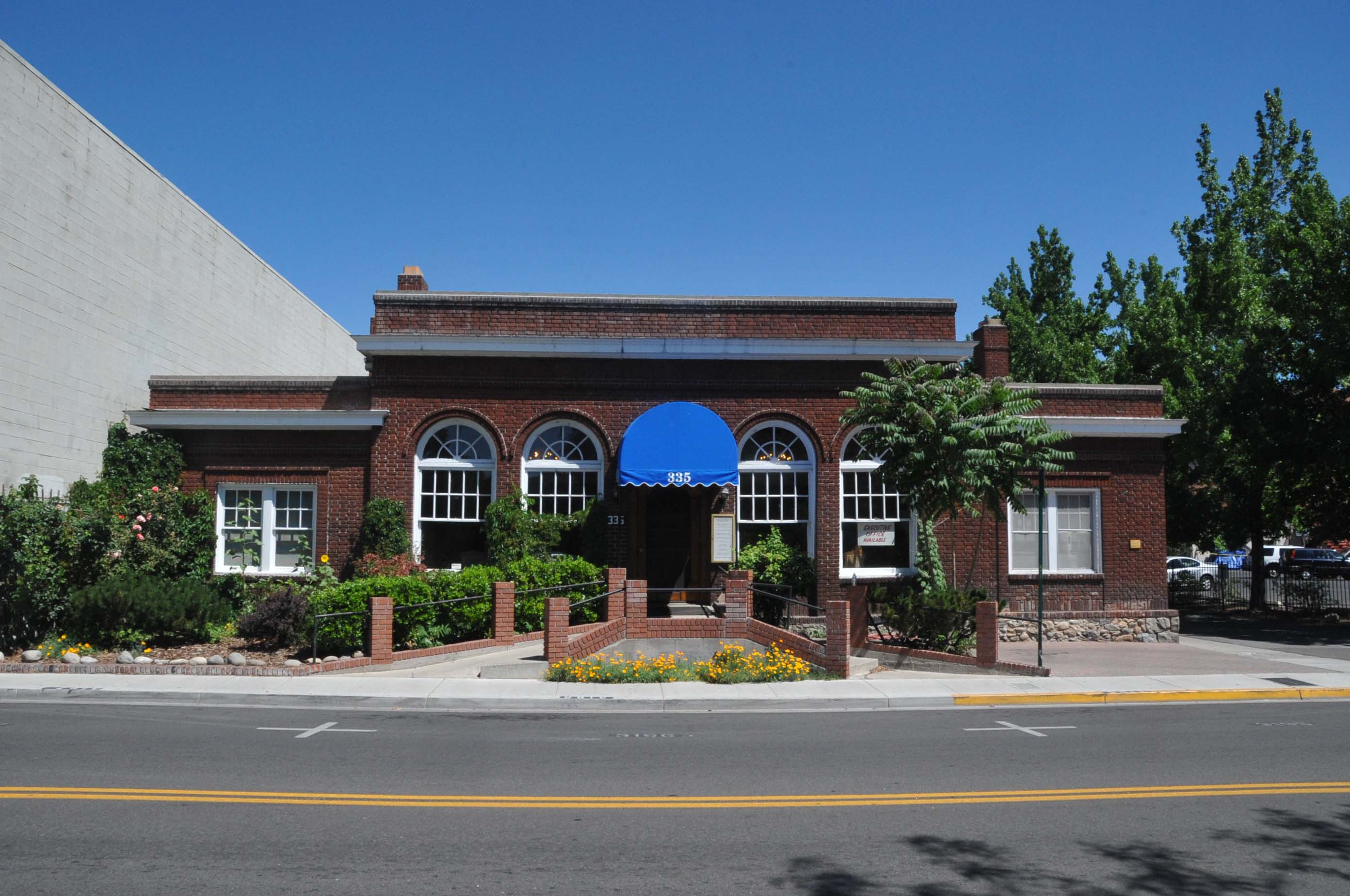
20th Century Club (Reno, Nevada)

Rachel Fitch Kent was Chapter Regent of The Nevada Sagebrush and Chapter member of the Daughters of the American Revolution.

She was a member of the 20th Century Club (Reno, Nevada), the Woman's Faculty Club of University of Nevada, the American Association of University Women and the Sigma Alpha Omega sorority.

She was a member of the advisory board and active volunteer of the Boca Raton Public Library, and retired in 1980.

== Personal life ==
A former resident of California, Rachel Fitch Kent moved to Reno, Nevada in 1920, and lived at 612 W. 5th St., Reno, Nevada.

Rachel Fitch married Professor Clarence Hammond Kent (1892-1966), member of the faculty at the University of Nevada. Clarence H. Kent became the Mechanical Engineering Department Head at the University of Arkansas in 1928, and in 1935 he was on the faculty of Pennsylvania State College.

They moved to Boca Raton, Florida, where her husband died in 1966.
