= DC10 (disambiguation) =

The McDonnell Douglas DC-10 is a three-engine wide-body jet airliner manufactured by McDonnell Douglas.

DC10 or DC-10 may also refer to:

- DC10 (nightclub), a nightclub on the island of Ibiza
- "DC-10", a song by Audio Adrenaline from the album Audio Adrenaline, 1992

== See also ==
- DC-10 Air Tanker, a DC-10 modified for aerial firefighting
- McDonnell Douglas DC-X, a single-stage-to-orbit spacecraft
- La Tante DC10 Restaurant, a restaurant in Accra, Ghana
- DCX (disambiguation)
