= Mary Yost =

American academic (1881–1954)

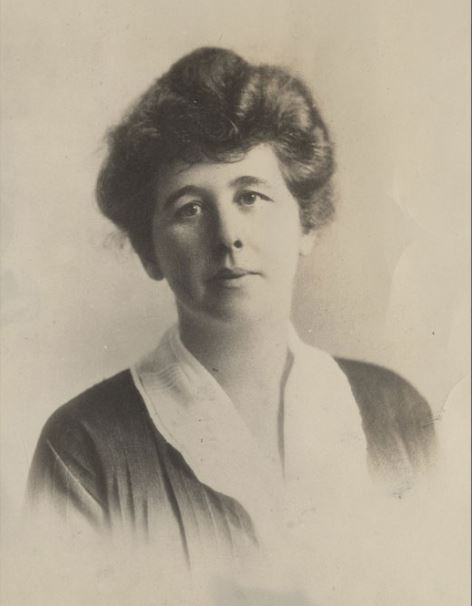
- published in 1921
- Born: September 25, 1881; Staunton, Virginia
- Died: March 4, 1954 (aged 72); Stanford, California
- Education: Vassar College
- Occupation: Educator
- Employer(s): Stanford University; University of Michigan
- Known for: Dean of Women and Assistant Professor of English

Mary Yost (September 25, 1881 – March 4, 1954) was an American academic. She was Dean of Women and Associate Professor of English at Stanford University from 1921 to 1946.

== Career ==
Mary Yost was born in Staunton, Virginia on September 25, 1881 and graduated from Vassar College in 1904. After a year teaching English at Wellesley College, she went back to Vassar to study a master's degree. In 1946, she was awarded an honorary degree by Mills College.

Yost began teaching at the University of Michigan in 1917. She moved to Stanford University four years later to take up the position of associate professor of English and Dean of Women, which she held until her retirement in 1946.

== Other work ==
Yost was an honorary member in Cap and Gown, an honor society for women undergraduates founded by Edith R. Mirrielees. In 1922, she became vice-president of the National Education Association's Department of Deans of Women's Western Division.

She took the position of vice-president of the American Association of University Women's California division in 1923, progressing to vice-president of the National Board from 1933 to 1937. She was a member of the Palo Alto Business and Professional Women's Club and the National Association of Deans of Women. On retirement she was awarded an honorary LL.D from Mills College "in recognition of her long service to women". She was also active in several student groups and organisations while at Stanford, including the women's residence program.

Yost died of a heart attack on March 4, 1954, at her home on campus.
