= Alice West Fleet =

First black educator in Arlington, Virginia (1909–2000)

Alice West Fleet (1909–2000) was the first American educator and an African American reading teacher in Arlington, Virginia, after desegregation of the Arlington County school system ended on February 2, 1959. She retired from teaching in 1971, after 31 years in the Arlington County school system.

== Biography ==
Fleet earned a master's degree from the University of Pennsylvania. She later pursued doctoral studies at the George Washington University, and joined the American Association of University Women.

Fleet and her husband, Edmond, took part in founding the first YMCA to offer recreation opportunities to the county's African American population. The center opened in 1953, with a program that expanded to include dances, movie screenings, social events, and sporting events. Fleet served on the board of directors until the 1990s.

Fleet served as president of The Northern Virginia alumnae chapter of Delta Sigma Theta sorority from 1967-1969.^{[5]}

Fleet was President-at-Large for the Arlington County Democratic Committee. The Fleets hosted Lady Bird Johnson at their home for a political event for the Virginia Lieutenant Governor's race in 1977, supporting the eventual winner Chuck Robb. Robb later appointed Fleet to two terms on the Virginia State Commission on the Status of Women. In this role, she advocated for equal rights in education.

After her husband's death in 1983, Fleet established a scholarship fund in his name to support financially disadvantaged college students.

== Legacy ==
In 2019, Arlington County named a newly built school Alice West Fleet Elementary. Fleet's name was selected because of the educator's "remarkable and long-lasting contributions to our community and to the education of Arlington County students." The school's motto is "Let nothing and no one stop you," a principle Fleet emphasized throughout her life.
