= Dorothy W. Douglas =

Economist and author

Dorothy Wolff Douglas
- Born: Dorothy Sybil Wolff; May 1, 1890; Manhattan, New York, US
- Died: December 9, 1968 (aged 78); Hempstead, New York, US
- Occupations: economist and author
- Years active: 1924–1968
- Known for: book Child Workers in America
- Spouse: Paul Douglas (Illinois politician)

Dorothy Wolff Douglas (1890–1968) was an economist and author educated at Columbia University, where she received her A.M. and Ph.D. degrees. She is best known for the book Child workers in America and for the accusation of communism from the House Un-American Activities Committee, where she refused to say whether she was a Communist.

== Biography ==
Her father, Samuel Wolff, was a general partner from 1884 to 1891 in the banking firm Kuhn, Loeb, & Co. and a member of a successful New York family that belonged to the cohesive society of wealthy New York Jews described in Our Crowd. Her mother, Clara Cohen Wolff, came from the family that founded the Wall Street investment banking firm J. & W. Seligman & Co.. Clara was active in the Emanuel Sisterhood, which sought to assimilate impoverished eastern European Jews by providing services like lunches and kindergarten for children, music and religion classes, and vocational training.

Dorothy attended Bryn Mawr as an undergraduate in the class of 1912. She then attended Columbia University to study sociology and economics. There she met and married Paul Douglas, future U. S. Senator. They were married in 1915, the same year she received her master's degree in economics. In 1925, she completed her Ph.D. at Columbia in French economic history.

For several years, they moved around the country while Paul worked at various jobs. In 1919, he accepted an appointment at the University of Chicago, but Dorothy could not teach there due to anti-nepotism rules. In 1924, she was offered a job as an instructor at Smith College and Paul joined her, taking a teaching job at Amherst College. During this period, she was also chairman of the committee on industry of the League of Women Voters.

In 1930, the couple divorced and Dorothy was promoted to assistant professor. At the same time she began a romantic relationship with Katharine DuPre Lumpkin, who was teaching at Mount Holyoke College. Dorothy's ample trust fund, which she inherited on her father's death, allowed her to buy The Manse in Northampton, Massachusetts, where the couple lived with Dorothy's four children by Paul Douglas. They remained together until the 1950s.

Douglas studied labor and labor legislation, especially women and children in the workforce. During the depression, she used her personal wealth to fund research in economic history at Smith College and to found the Council on Industrial Studies, whose initial assistant-director was Katharine DuPre Lumpkin. This last was done with an anonymous gift.

In 1939, Betty Friedan (then Bettye Naomi Goldstein) took a class from Douglas in which she first began to appreciate the problem of female oppression.

An English professor at Smith College, Robert Gorham Davis, testified before the House Un-American Activities Committee that Lumpkin and Douglas were Communists and that they belonged to a Communist faction of the American Federation of Teachers. Lumpkin's sister Grace also testified before Joseph McCarthy's Permanenet Investigating Subcommittee of the Government Operations Committee and accused her sister and Dorothy Douglas of being Communists. Douglas took the Fifth Amendment on being questioned by the McCarthy Committee. Subsequently, Lumpkin and Douglas separated and moved away from Northampton.

From 1954 to 1960, Douglas was a visiting professor of economics at Gettysburg College. From 1960 until her death, she was a professor of economics at Hofstra.

== Publications ==
- Douglas, Paul; Douglas, Dorothy Wolff (December 1921). "What can a man afford?" (PDF). American Economic Review. 11 (4). American Economic Association: 1–11+13–33+35–95. JSTOR 1807356.
- Douglas, Dorothy Wolff (1925). Guillaume De Greef: The Social Theory Of An Early Syndicalist. New York: Columbia University.
- Lumpkin, Katharine DuPre; Douglas, Dorothy Wolff (1937). Child workers in America. New York: International Publishers. Archived from the original on November 14, 2006.
- Douglas, Dorothy Wolff (1972). Transitional Economic Systems: the Polish-Czech example. New York: Monthly Review Press. ISBN 9781136229541. Archived from the original on February 11, 2019.
