= Wilhelmine Wissman Yoakum =

First woman to be elected to Oakland City Council

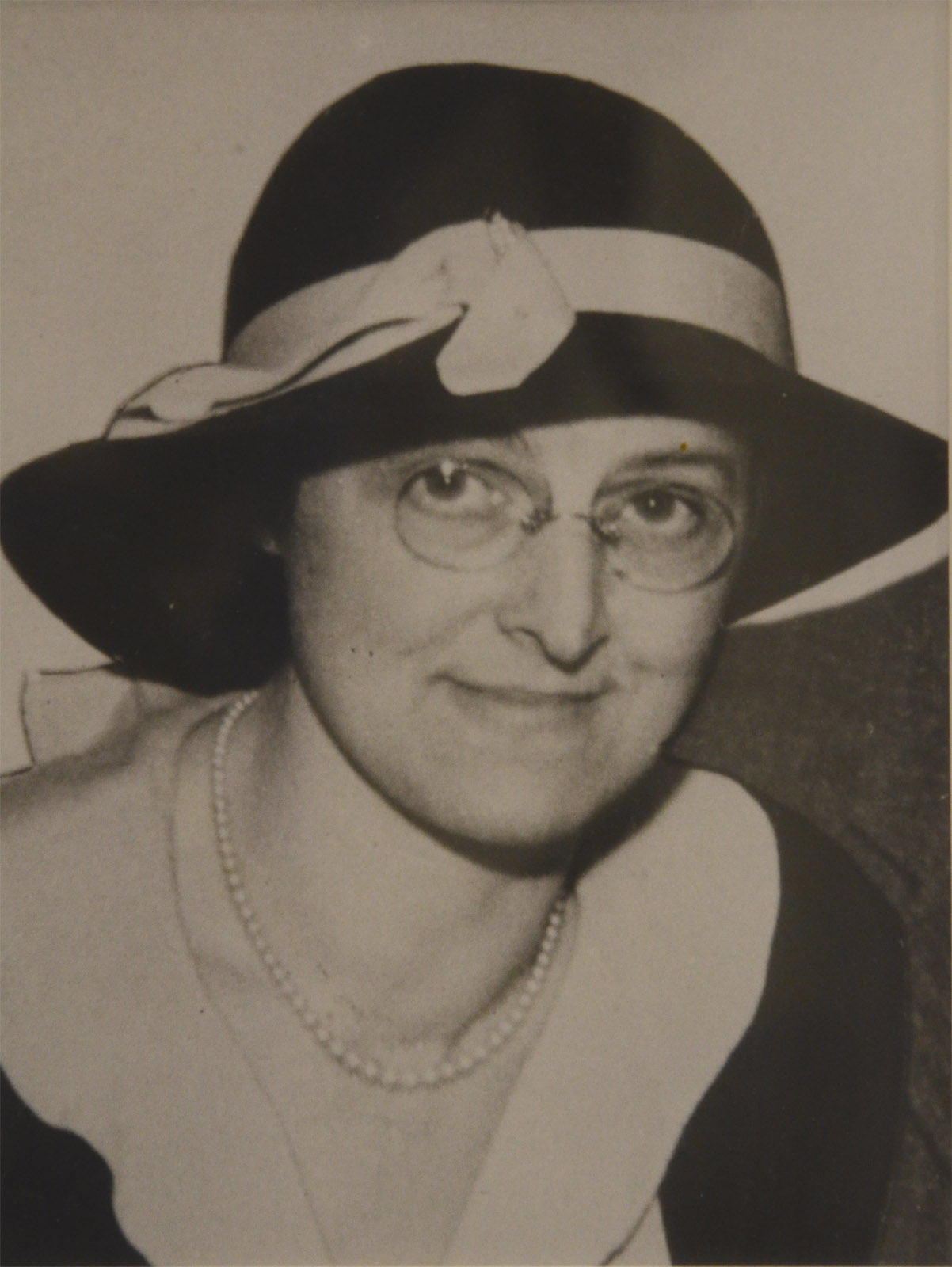
Wilhelmine Wissman Yoakum

Wilhelmine Wissman Yoakum (July 16, 1891 - February 24, 1983) was the first woman elected to Oakland City Council.

== Early life ==
Wilhelmine Wissman was born on July 16, 1891, in New Jersey, the daughter of Herman Wissman and Katherine Kohler.

She attended Cornell University, where she met her future husband and fellow student, Finis E. Yoakum, Jr., later a consulting engineer. Wilhelmine Yoakum obtained a master's degree in language studies from University of California, Berkeley.

== Career ==
Yoakum was the treasurer of the State League of Women Voters. She was the secretary of the League of Women Voters's predecessor, the Oakland Forum. She also held offices in other organizations.

She was a member of the American Association of University Women, Kappa Kappa Gamma, Cornell University Club of Northern California.

On May 12, 1931, she was elected for the position of Councilman at Large, No. 1, with a total of 20,888 votes. She defeated William Baccus, who had previously been elected to City Council many times as a member of the Republican party. When she ran as an incumbent in 1933, she was the only woman amongst 45 candidates. Mrs. Yoakum was defeated by Walter F. Jacobsen in that election, receiving 22,584 votes to Mr. Jacobsen's 24,101 votes.

She served for 22 years as the Executive Director of the International Institute of Oakland. She retired from the International Institute in 1962.

== Personal life ==
Wilhelmine Wissman Yoakum lived in New York and moved to California in 1913. She married Finis Ewing Yoakum (1891-1958) and had three children: Fanita Ewing Yoakum Druehl (1916-1987), Katherine Ann Yoakum Heringer (1920-1988), Franklin L. Yoakum (1922-1974). They lived at 472 Vernon Street, Oakland, California.

Her husband died in a small plane crash in Brazil in 1958 and was buried near the site of the crash.

She died on February 24, 1983.
