= Nan Aron =

American lawyer (born 1948)

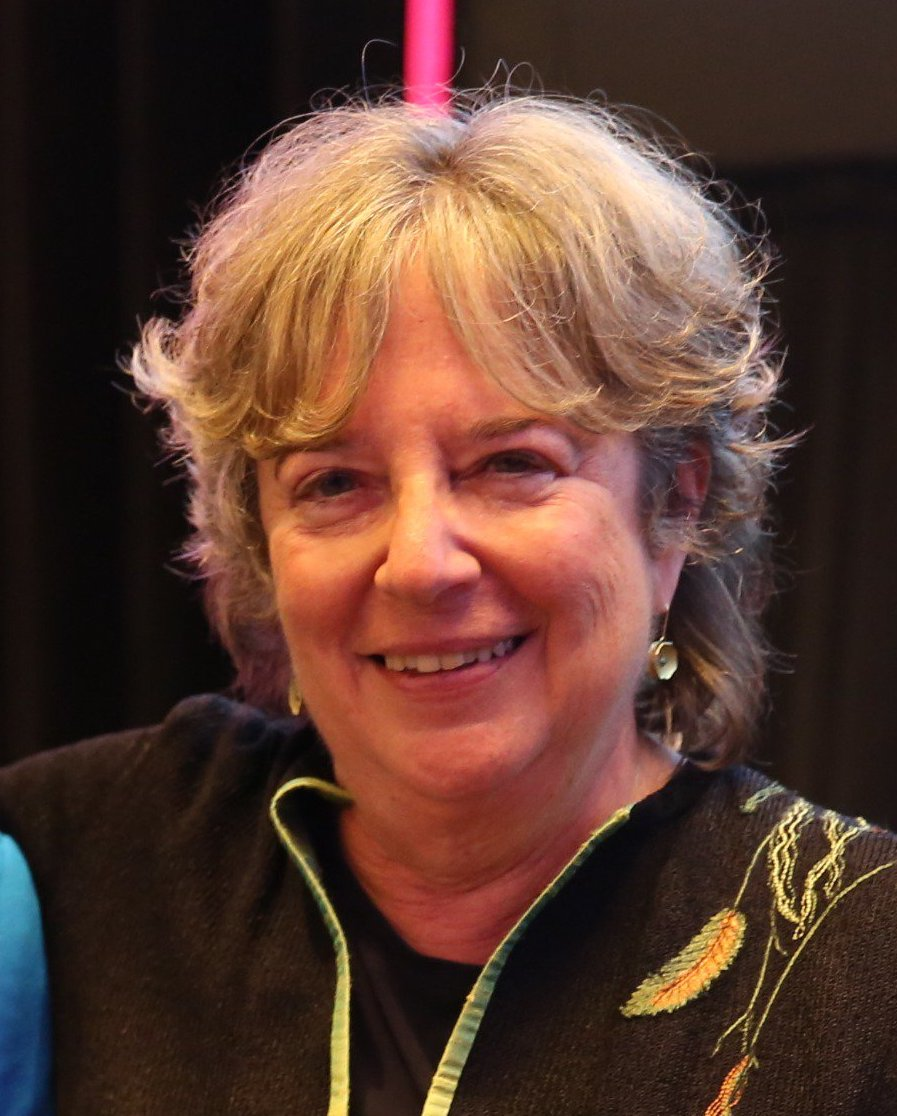
- Born: January 4, 1948 (age 78); New York City, U.S.
- Education: Oberlin College (BA); Case Western Reserve University (JD)
- Occupation: Lawyer

Nan Aron (born January 4, 1948) is an American lawyer and the founder and president emeritus of Alliance for Justice (AFJ), a liberal judicial advocacy group in the United States. Staunchly progressive, Aron has been a noted opponent of conservative judicial nominees in the United States. She repeatedly called for former Presidents Bill Clinton and Barack Obama to be more aggressive in nominating progressives to the bench, and during George W. Bush's presidency, urged the Democrat-controlled Senate to consider Bush's nominees closely. She is considered a key player in confirmation hearings for judicial nominees, and, in 2005, was called "the Madame Defarge of liberal court watchers" in the Wall Street Journal.

== Career ==
Aron received her B.A. in sociology and Chinese from Oberlin College and her J.D. from Case Western Reserve University School of Law. Prior to founding Alliance for Justice, Aron worked as a staff attorney for the ACLU's National Prison Project. Aron went on to serve as a trial attorney for the United States Equal Employment Opportunity Commission, where she litigated race and sex discrimination cases against companies and unions in federal and district courts. In 1979, Aron founded the Alliance for Justice, and began investigating judicial nominees during Ronald Reagan's presidency. She established the Alliance's Judicial Selection Project in 1985.

Aron has taught at Georgetown and George Washington University Law Schools, and serves on the Dean's Advisory Council at American University's Washington College of Law.

Aron authored Liberty and Justice for All: Public Interest Law in the 1980s and Beyond in 1989, which the Harvard Law Review said was "[s]ure to evoke a new pledge of allegiance to public interest law", as well as Justice in the Making—A Citizen's Guide in 1993 with Alliance for Justice.

Aron referenced overcoming the dual challenges of being a woman and a Jew in the State Department in 2004.

== Personal life ==
Aron was born in a Jewish household in 1948 in New York City. She is married to psychiatrist Bernard Arons; they have three children.
