= Helen G. Fisk =

American vocational support executive

Helen Graves Fisk
- Born: July 17, 1895; Redlands, California
- Died: October 30, 1986 (aged 91)
- Education: Mount Holyoke College
- Occupation: Vocational support executive

Helen Graves Fisk (1895–1986) was an American vocational support executive who was active in service bureaus in Pasadena and Los Angeles from the 1920s. For many years, she was assistant director at the Pasadena Vocation Bureau where she was a close colleague of Winifred M. Hausam.

== Biography ==
Born on July 17, 1895, in Redlands, California, Helen Fisk was the daughter of the pioneering realtor John Proctor Fisk (1857–1945) and his wife Elizabeth Holland (1860–1945).

Fisk attended Mount Holyoke College in South Hadley, Massachusetts, graduating with a bachelor's degree in 1917. After moving to Pasadena in 1922, she became assistant director at the Pasadena Vocation Bureau and the Bureau of Vocational Service of Los Angeles. She served on the boards of several administrative bodies and was active in a wide range of clubs in the Pasadena and Los Angeles areas.

Helen G. Fisk died on October 30, 1986, and is buried in Hillside Memorial Park, Redlands.

== Legacy ==
Established in 1973 by the School of Educational Studies at the Claremont Graduate University, the Winifred Hausam–Helen Fisk Award for Distinction in Higher Education honors outstanding service and academic achievement in higher education. It is presented to a doctoral student who has demonstrated exceptional ability in academic studies, scholarly writing, internship and service to students. The award celebrates the memory of Winifred Hausam and Helen Graves Fisk (1895–1986), both of whom pioneered vocational opportunities for women and contributed to developing professional services for college students.
