= Robin Gee =

American dancer, choreographer, and filmmaker

Robin M. Gee is an American dancer, choreographer, and filmmaker. She serves on the faculty at the University of North Carolina at Greensboro as a professor of dance in the UNCG College of Visual and Performing Arts and was the founding faculty advisor for Delta Chi Xi honorary dance fraternity.

== Biography ==
Gee earned a Master of Fine Arts degree in dance choreography and performance from Sarah Lawrence College. She danced with New York-based companies Les Ballet Bagata and Maimouna Keita Dance Company. Gee serves as the director of the Greensboro Film Festival. She is also the artistic director of the African dance company Sugarfoote Productions, which she founded in 2006. She was the artistic director and choreographer of Cinque Folkloric Dance Company in New York for fifteen years.

Gee serves as an associate professor of dance at the University of North Carolina at Greensboro, teaching African dance, Caribbean dance, and contemporary dance at the UNCG College of Visual and Performing Arts. She was the founding faculty advisor for Delta Chi Xi.

In 2011 she performed Ramblin' Blues, a solo choreographed by Duane Cyrus and set to music of Aretha Franklin, at the North Carolina Dance Festival in Boone, Wilmington, and Greensboro. In 2013 Gee spent six months in Burkina Faso, studying dance and music as a Fulbright Scholar. In 2018 Gee directed the dance film Wanting. In 2019 she was featured in the dance documentary Transmission.

Gee is the recipient of the West African Research Association's Post Doctoral Fellowship in African Research and the Central Piedmont Regional Artists Hub Grant, which she was awarded in 2005 for her work on dance documentation in Guinea. She was awarded a postdoctoral research fellowship from the American Association of University Women for her work on The Mande Legacy, a multimedia dance documentation.
