= Sarah Harder =

American feminist and professor of English

- Born: Sarah Jane Snell; September 9, 1937 (age 89); Chicago, Illinois, US
- Education: B.A., English and history, 1963, University of Wisconsin–Eau Claire; MA., 1966, Bowling Green State University
- Spouse(s): Richard Cass (div. 1961) Harry Harder (m. 1965)
- Children: 4

Sarah Jane Harder (nee Snell; born September 9, 1937) is an American feminist and associate professor emerita of English at the University of Wisconsin–Eau Claire. She started the women's studies program at the University of Wisconsin–Eau Claire and served as president of the American Association of University Women.

== Early life ==
Harder was born as Sarah Jane Snell on September 9, 1937, to parents Margaret and Frank. Her mother was of Irish descent, and her father of Swedish. They raised her and her sister Susan as Catholic.

She enrolled in the University of Iowa but dropped out to live with her future husband. She was unhappy as a housewife and her parents encouraged her to go back to school. Even as she was pregnant, Harder continued her education and eventually divorced her husband.

== Career ==
As a single mother with her parents help, she obtained a degree in both English and history from the University of Wisconsin–La Crosse. During her college years, she was a sorority member of Alpha Delta Pi. After graduation, she became an English professor at the University of Wisconsin–Eau Claire alongside her husband Harry. However, when she became pregnant she was denied maternity leave. She fought this and overturned the policy across the entire UW system. In 1971, Harder became a founding member of the National Organization for Women in Wisconsin. She later became an advisor for older students at the University of Wisconsin-Eau Claire. In 1975, she was appointed assistant to the chancellor for affirmative action and educational opportunities at the University of Wisconsin-Eau Claire. She was the first Title IX officer at the University of Wisconsin, Eau Claire. At the conclusion of the 1970s, Harder was a key figure in creating the Wisconsin Women's Network. During her lengthy career at the university, Harder founded the women's studies program, which she later chaired.

In 1983, Harder was appointed convener of the Wisconsin Women's Council, and two years later was elected president of the American Association of University Women (AAUW). The Wisconsin Women's Council was composed of 15 women selected by Anthony Earl to address, amongst other topics, women in poverty. In 1985, Harder and Irene Natividad were elected co-presidents of the Council of Presidents (CP) of the National Council of Women's Organizations. That year, she was also invited to the United Nations' sponsored women's forum in Nairobi, Kenya. Her term as president lasted until 1989, when she was replaced by Sharon Schuster. While she served her term as president, Harder also chaired their Educational Foundation and was vice-president of the International Federation of University Women.

After leaving the AAUW, Harder became active in the National Peace Foundation (NPF). She was also elected president of the NGO Women for a Meaningful Summit in 1988. With the NPF, she helped manage the Open World Programme, which was launched in 1999, which aimed to bring together 5,000 Russian leaders to learn about the US's free enterprise system. She was elected president of NPF in 2006. In 1991, she and Mike Blanchard co-chaired the Education for Employment Council in Wisconsin.

In February 2013, Harder and her husband were named professor emerita of the University of Wisconsin–Eau Claire.
