= Bernice McCoy =

American educator

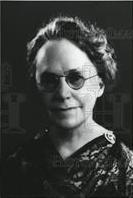
Bernice McCoy

Bernice McCoy (1878 - October 15, 1944) was an American educator, Dean of Women at State Normal School, Lewiston.

== Early life ==
Bernice McCoy was born in 1878 in Portland, Oregon, the daughter of J. B. McCoy and Harriet Hald.

She obtained B. S. and M. S. degrees at University of Idaho. She graduated from Lewiston State Normal School in Lewiston, Idaho in 1898. In 1909 she became a postgraduate student at Columbia University.

== Career ==
In 1898 she started teaching in the Vineland schools.

Bernice McCoy was an assistant professor of Education at University of Idaho. She was Director of Placement Service and Non-Resident Instruction.

She was County Superintendent of Schools in Nez Perce County, Idaho from 1903 to 1909.

For 6 years she was assistant of the State Superintendent and then State Superintendent of Schools of Public Instruction elected in 1914 under the Republican ticket. In 1916 she declined to be a candidate for renomination.

She was an instructor at Lewiston State Normal School, Lewiston, Idaho. She was Dean of Women at State Normal School, Lewiston, from 1917 to 1919. In 1919 she resigned to take up war service.

She was a member of the State Board of Education.

She was the National Field Secretary for the Young Women's Christian Association from 1919 to 1921 in Cincinnati, Ohio.

In 1919 she became a member of the Faculty at University of Idaho and was member of the Academic Council since 1926.

She was a member of Pi Lambda Theta and American Association of University Women.

From July 4, 1917 to April 14, 1920 she corresponded with Dora Kelly Lewis. In 1917 she corresponded with Ada Lois James.

== Personal life ==
Bernice McCoy moved to Idaho in 1893 and lived at 801 West Sixth St., Moscow, Idaho.

She died on October 15, 1944, in Lewinston, Idaho, and is buried at Normal Hill Cemetery.
