= Achsa E. Paxman =

American politician (1885–1968)

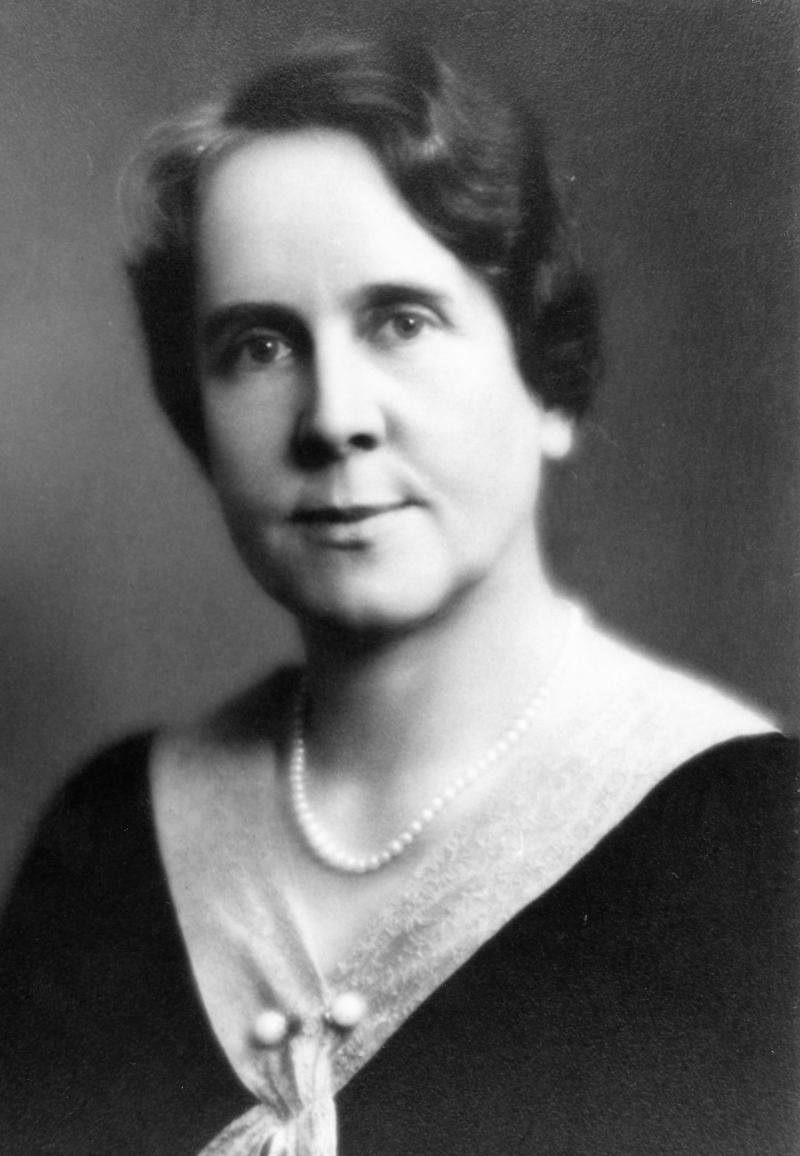
Achsa E. Paxman

Achsa Henrietta Eggertsen Paxman (June 28, 1885 – August 8, 1968) was an American educator and member of the Utah State Legislature for two terms, in 1925 and 1927.

== Early life ==
Achsa Henrietta Eggertsen was born in Provo, Utah Territory, on June 28, 1885, the daughter of Simon Peter Eggertsen (1860–1938) and Henrietta Petrea Nielsen (1861–1949).

She attended Provo City schools and then Brigham Young Academy between 1902 and 1904 and obtained an elementary teaching certificate.

== Career ==
Achsa E. Paxman was an elementary and high school teacher for several years; she taught in Provo and American Fork schools until her marriage. After her marriage she worked as a stenographer and was active in civic affairs. She also taught elocution lessons.

She was a member of the Utah House of Representatives for two terms, in 1925 and 1927; she was president of the State League of Women Voters; she was president of the Women's Republican Club; she was president of the Utah State Relief Society; she was member of the Municipal Council.

She was also member of the Nelke Reading Club and the High School Faculty Women.

From 1935 to 1964 she served on the Utah County Welfare board. From 1936 to 1954 she was a member of the Utah Valley Hospital board.

== Personal life ==
On June 17, 1908, she married William Monroe Paxman (1881–1960) and had five children: Elaine Paxman Handley (1909-1992), William Rulon Paxman (1911–1992), Beth Paxman Pulley (1913–1990), Monroe Junior Paxman (1919-2017), Doressa Paxman Child (1923–2006). They lived at 441 West First South, Provo, Utah.

She died on August 8, 1968, and is buried at Provo City Cemetery, Provo.
