= Mountain Plains Library Association =

American professional association

Coordinates: 39.70776°N 105.16047°W

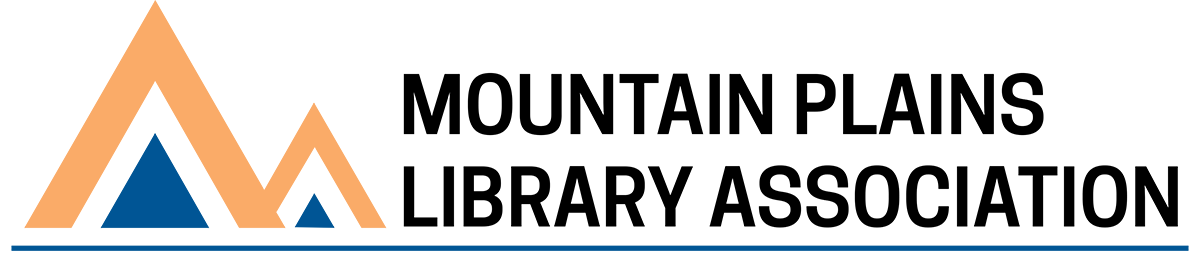
- Abbreviation: MPLA
- Formation: 1948
- Type: Non-profit
- Purpose: "To promote the development of librarians and libraries by providing significant educational and networking opportunities to members from the twelve-state region."
- Headquarters: Hyrum, UT
- Region served: United States
- Members: 523 personal members, 56 institutional members; and 13 honorary and life members (July 2010)
- President: Erin Wahl
- Main organ: MPLA Newsletter
- Budget: $76,000 (April 2010)
- Staff: 3
- Website: mpla.us

The Mountain Plains Library Association (MPLA) is a non-profit organization based in the western United States that promotes the development of librarians and libraries by providing educational and networking opportunities to members.

Modeled on the Pacific Northwest Library Association, MPLA brings together librarians and those involved in libraries from across the Mountain Plains region. The MPLA region can be characterized as sparsely peopled, with densely populated urban areas widely separated from one another, often divided by vast areas of prairie grassland or mountain ranges. Librarians serving the area share challenges related to the geographical realities of the region

== History ==
Founded at a meeting in Estes Park, Colorado, by librarians from Colorado, Kansas, Nebraska, the Dakotas and Wyoming, the Mountain Plains Library Association was designed to facilitate regional American Library Association meetings. Within three days a temporary constitution had been drafted, Ralph T. Esterquist was elected president and Ruth V. Tyler was elected vice-president/president-elect. Thus, on 31 August 1948, the Mountain Plains Library Association was born

== Membership ==
MPLA membership is open to librarians, library paraprofessionals and friends of libraries. Individuals and institutional memberships are available. Activities and the majority of members fall within the twelve-state member region, but individual members can hail from anywhere.

== Governing structure ==
The MPLA is governed by an elected board of representatives from each member state and a number of sections and roundtables representing interests and types of libraries. Officers making up the executive board are the current president, vice-president/president-elect, past president, and a recording secretary. In addition to its board and its officers, MPLA activities are carried out by committees and an executive secretary.

== Activities ==
MPLA provides education opportunities in the form of meetings and workshops, provides professional development grants to members, and, since 2001, has held a Leadership Institute for up to 30 participants. Annual conferences have included a scholarly research forum since the early 1950s. The association has sponsored publications focusing on inter-library cooperation, literacy and the humanities, librarianship and technology in the Mountain Plains region

== Awards ==
Awards are presented at each annual conference:

- The Carl Gaumer Library Champion Award recognizes an individual, organization or company showing close support of the Mountain Plains Library Association.
- The MPLA Distinguished Service Award recognizes an MPLA member who has made notable contributions to the library profession or has furthered significant development of libraries in the Mountain Plains region. In the case of retired individuals, the nominee may be a past member of MPLA.
- The MPLA Literary Contribution Award is presented to an author whose published writings have furthered an appreciation of the Mountain Plains region. The author need not reside in the region. Published works are evaluated on the basis of literary worth, readability, and evidence of responsible research.
- The MPLA Beginning Professional Award recognizes an MPLA member who, as a librarian/media specialist within the first five years after receiving a library/media master's degree, has made a positive impact on the quality and role of library service. Factors such as innovative programming and planning, use of resources and special projects are considered.
- The MPLA Dan Chaney Unsung Hero Award is presented to any library individual or group in the MPLA region who have worked on a special project that has some significance to a community but which has not been eligible for a library award.

== Conferences ==
The MPLA meets annually in joint conferences with member states on a rotational basis.

== See also ==
- List of U.S. state library associations
- List of libraries in the United States
