= Carolyn Jefferson-Jenkins =

American activist and clubwoman (born 1952)

- Born: Carolyn Jefferson; September 19, 1952

Academic background
- Education: Cleveland State University, Ph.D. Kent State University, M.Ed. Kent State University, Ed.S. Western College for Women, B.A.
- Alma mater: Cleveland State University
- Thesis: An historical analysis of the relationship between the Great Migration and the administrative policies and practices of racial isolation in the Cleveland public schools, 1920–1940 (1991)

Carolyn Jefferson-Jenkins served two terms as president of the League of Women Voters of the United States. She served as Vice President of the League of Women Voters of the United States from 1996 to 1998 before being elected president in 1998. Jefferson-Jenkis served as national president from 1998 to 2002. She is the only woman of color to have served as national president in the organization's first one hundred years.

== Early life and education ==
Jefferson-Jenkins was born in Cleveland, Ohio. She grew up during the American civil rights movement and was inspired by the movement to become active in civics. Jefferson-Jenkins attended Western College for Women in Oxford, Ohio and graduated with a B.A. education and political science in 1974. She went on to earn an M.Ed. from John Carroll University in Cleveland, Ohio, and an Ed.S. from Kent State University in Kent, Ohio. She graduated with her doctorate from Cleveland State University in 1991, focusing her dissertation work on analyzing the role of administration on racial isolation in Cleveland public schools in the early twentieth century.

== Career ==
She worked in the Cleveland public schools starting in 1979 until 1993, and then served as principal of Taylor Academy until 1995. Jefferson-Jenkins was a vice president of Junior Achievement starting in 1995 and was promoted to a vice president in 1996; she left the organization in 1998. Jefferson-Jenkins filed a suit against Junior Achievement for race discrimination in 1999, the suit was settled in 2002. After leaving Junior Achievement she went on to work for the National Center for Education and the Economy, the University of Colorado at Denver and retired from Douglas County Schools Colorado. She now works with the Center for Racial Justice in Education.

Jefferson-Jenkins joined the League of Women Voters in 1982, and she led a 1996 "Get Out the Vote" campaign, which registered more than 50,000 voters nationally. In 1998 she was elected as the 15th President of the League of Women Voters and subsequently elected to a second term as president; she served from 1998 to 2002. She was the first woman of African descent to serve as president to the league. While Jefferson-Jenkins served as president, the league helped pass the Bipartisan Campaign Reform Act in 2002, which closed loopholes in campaign finance. She also spoke on the need for campaign finance, worked to increase voting using public awareness ads, sought to broaden participation in democracy, and established a means to increase membership in the League of Women Voters. In 2001, Jefferson-Jenkins moderated the Denver segment of a televised Town Hall meeting where Kofi Annan spoke to help people living in the United States better understand the role of the United Nation in fighting terrorism.

In 2014, she moved to North Carolina to work at the Hunt Institute. Since 2018 Jefferson-Jenkins has worked as an adjunct assistant professor at the University of North Carolina at Chapel Hill.

== Awards and honors ==
In 2001, Distinguished Alumni Award Civic Engagement – Cleveland State University, In 2010, Girl Scouts of Colorado named Jefferson-Jenkins one of eleven "Women of Distinction". In 2020, Jefferson-Jenkins became the third recipient of the Freedom Summer 1964 Award from Miami University Jefferson-Jenkins was the 2021 commencement speaker at Miami University and received an honorary doctorate during that event. She was also a recipient of the "Civic Leadership Award" from the National Coalition on Black Civic Participation.

== Selected publications ==
- Jefferson, Carolyn; Cleveland State University; League of Women Voters of Cleveland; Educational Fund (1991). One man, one vote: the history of the African-American vote in the United States. Cleveland, OH: LWVCEF in cooperation with Cleveland State University. OCLC 7961981815.
- Jefferson-Jenkins, Carolyn (2020). The untold story of women of color in the League of Women Voters. Gracia Hillman. Santa Barbara, California. ISBN 978-1-4408-7450-5. OCLC 1131897150.
