= Winifred M. Hausam =

American vocational support executive

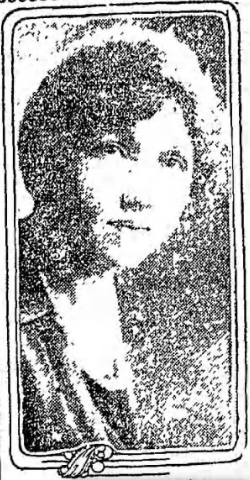
Winifred M. Hausam, May 8, 1922, The Los Angeles Times

Winifred May Horman Hausam (June 7, 1883 – October 1, 1967) was an American vocational executive who founded and managed vocational service bureaus for women in the Los Angeles area. Active in a wide variety of business, educational and women's clubs, she headed the Western Personnel Institute in Pasadena for over 30 years. She also helped to establish programs for women during the Depression, providing jobs for skilled women.

== Early life and education ==
Born in the mid-1880s in Chicago, Illinois, Winifred May Horman Hausam was the daughter of George W. Hausam and Emma M. Horman. After schooling in Chicago, she attended the University of California, Los Angeles and Columbia University in New York City.

== Career ==
Hausam began her career in California around 1912. Initially a teacher, she assumed various responsibilities in institutes dealing with pioneering vocational services for women. In 1919, she established and headed the Pasadena Vocational Bureau. On the basis of the success of the services in Pasadena, a couple of years later the Bureau of Vocational Services in Los Angeles was established, again with Hausam at the Helm. She had already become vice-chair of the National Committee of Bureaus of Occupation and director of vocational services at the California Federation of Business and Professional Women's Clubs. While in Pasadena, she published Outdoor occupations for women in California (1922). By 1934, Hausam reported the Pasadena Vocational Bureau had helped hundreds of women to find work. In 1936, as head of the employment bureau, she announced that Pasadena was in the forefront of placing women in private industry, specifying that 846 women had been placed in December 1935 while there had generally been a decline elsewhere.

In 1931, together with her associate Helen Fisk, she established the Western Personnel Service, later the Western Personnel Institute. She explained the progress achieved and priorities for the future in Guidance of Adults: Outside of Full-time School Situations, published in 1934.

Winifred May Hausam continued to head the Western Personnel Institute until her retirement in 1961. She died in Pasadena on October 1, 1967, and is buried in Mountain View Cemetery, Altadena, Los Angeles County.

== Legacy ==
Established in 1973 by the School of Educational Studies at the Claremont Graduate University, the Winifred Hausam–Helen Fisk Award for Distinction in Higher Education honors outstanding service and academic achievement in higher education. It is presented to a doctoral student who has demonstrated exceptional ability in academic studies, scholarly writing, internship and service to students. The award celebrates the memory of Winifred Hausam and Helen Graves Fisk (1895-1986), both of whom pioneered vocational opportunities for women and contributed to developing professional services for college students.
