= Percy Maxim Lee =

American political and social reformer

- Born: July 4, 1906; Hartford, Connecticut, US
- Died: November 9, 2002 (aged 96); New London, Connecticut, US

Percy Maxim Lee was an American political and social reformer who was involved in leadership roles in various institutions. Most notably, she was the President of the League of Women Voters of the United States from 1950-1958. She was almost always called Mrs. John G. Lee in newspaper coverage.

== League of Women Voters ==
Lee was president of the League of Women Voters of the United States from 1950 to 1958, during the period when Joseph McCarthy was alleging communist influence throughout the US government and other institutions. In 1951, in order to educate its members and the public about the importance of freedom of speech and thought, the League created a Freedom Agenda Committee, which published a document Individual Liberty USA. In 1955, the American Legion attacked the Freedom Agenda as disloyal to the United States. Percy Lee gave a speech in Indianapolis refusing to repudiate it. This was also the beginning of the period of the largest membership growth in League history, from 1950 to 1970, growing from 126,000 members in 1954 to 156,780 in 1969.

Throughout her term as president Lee promoted the League's policy of supporting international cooperation. Before the 1952 convention of the League, Lee said that "Support of United States policies to strengthen the United Nations and to bring about international economic development continues to be a subject of great interest to membership." In 1952, she announced a campaign to improve citizens' understanding of United States trade policy. In 1953, she was active in a League of Women Voters campaign to promote "more solid backing of the United Nations, a more liberal international trade policy, and restoration of technical assistance (Point Four) funds" to foreign countries. Under her leadership in 1954, the League program reaffirmed support of the United Nations and for "United States participation in international programs for regional defense, economic development, and technical assistance". She later testified against the Bricker Amendment limiting Presidential treaty-making powers and strongly supported the League's study of international trade and individual liberty. In 1955, as League president, she testified at a Senate Subcommittee on Constitutional Rights hearing "against Senator Joseph McCarthy's abuse of Congressional investigative powers". In 1956, Lee was re-elected for the fourth time and the program adopted included "individual liberties with an emphasis on loyalty-security programs and conservation with an emphasis on water resources". In her time as President of the League of Women Voters, Lee was generally referred to as Mrs. John G. Lee in newspaper coverage.

She was president of the Connecticut State League during the time when the League was opposed to the Equal Rights Amendment (ERA). She quoted the League position in a letter to a proponent of the ERA that first, that it "would do violence to the political system embodied in our Constitution" by allowing Congress to make rules on matters formerly reserved to local bodies, and later, that it would create confusion and uncertainty and invite litigation.

== Other professional activity ==
In her professional life, Lee was a founder of The Renbrook School, served on the Board of Trustees of the Putney School and Connecticut College, and held various appointed positions, including Vice Chairman of the Board of Trustees for Connecticut College, Chairman of the Capitol Region Planning Agency, and Chairman of the Consumer Advisory Council. She also served on the State Library Commission, the Commission on the Status of Women, and The Clean Water Task Force, and acted as a liaison between the public and The Foreign Operations Administration from 1954 to 1955. President John Kennedy and President Lyndon Johnson both appointed her to positions, including the Consumer Advisory Council and Public Land Law Review Commission.

== Personal life ==
Lee had held four honorary degrees (LL.D. from Rutgers University, Drexel Institute, Cedar Crest College, and LH.D. from the University of Hartford). She was married to John Glessner Lee and they had four children. Additionally, during World War II, the Lee family hosted two daughters of Oxford University professors and a German family of three in their home.
