= Nan B. Frank =

American politician

- Born: May 2, 1886; Princeton, Illinois
- Died: April 24, 1980 (aged 93); San Mateo, California

Nan B. Frank was a United States social worker and women's suffrage leader.

== Early life ==
Nan Bamburgh was born on May 2, 1886, in Princeton, Illinois. She was the daughter of Joseph J. and Regina Bamburgh.

== Career ==
Nan B. Frank was a volunteering social worker.

Frank was very active in League of Women Voters of California and served on several important committees.

Frank was the president of the San Francisco Center of California League of Women Voters. When women obtained the right to vote in California in 1911, they started the San Francisco Center; in 1920, the center became part of the League of Women Voters.

Frank was a member of: Women's City Club and Temple Emanu-El Sisterhood.

== Personal life ==
Nan B. Frank moved to California at the beginning of the 20th century and lived at 139 Fourteenth Ave., San Francisco, California.

Nan Bamburgh married Ludwig Frank. Their children were: James E, Richard L., Emily Ann.

She died on April 24, 1980, in San Mateo, California.
