= Delta Chi Xi =

North American collegiate fraternity

- ΔΧΞ
- Founded: April 20, 2010; 16 years ago University of North Carolina at Greensboro
- Type: Professional
- Affiliation: PFA
- Status: Active
- Emphasis: Dance
- Scope: National (US)
- Motto: "Live, Love, Dance"
- Colors: Royal Purple and Teal
- Symbol: Sun and Spiral
- Philanthropy: Dance Education
- Chapters: 7
- Nicknames: DCX, Chi Xis
- Headquarters: 3218 Hiddenwood Lane; Burlington, North Carolina 27215; United States
- Website: www.deltachixi.org

Delta Chi Xi Honorary Dance Fraternity, Inc. (ΔΧΞ), more commonly referred to as Delta Chi Xi, is a co-ed American honorary professional fraternity. Its purpose is to acknowledge academic excellence, serve the community, and share the art of dance among fellow students. It is member of the Professional Fraternity Association.

== History ==
Delta Chi Xi Honorary Dance Fraternity, Inc. was founded at the University of North Carolina at Greensboro (UNCG) on April 20, 2010. The organization was established as an honorary dance society by Kara J. Wade, Jennifer R. Cheek, and Kristina M. Rogers who worked under the guidance of UNCG Dance Department Faculty member Robin Gee.

The fourteen original charter members were:

- Jennifer Cheek
- Whitleigh Cook
- Molly Derrickson
- Lauren Drake
- Rebekah Gonzalez
- Joy Kelly
- Andrea Lalley
- Ann Brady Lewis
- Margaret Moncure
- Meredith Shaver
- Carrie Simpson
- Kristi Townsend
- Kara Wade
- Ruth Ward

Soon thereafter, it transformed from an honors society into an honors fraternity. Later, it became a coeducational professional fraternity. Delta Chi Xi was incorporated by the State of North Carolina on October 20, 2011.

Delta Chi Xi expanded to eight collegiate chapters, seven of which are active as of 2024. Its also has one alumni chapter. On November 12, 2013, Delta Chi Xi was accepted into the Professional Fraternity Association, making it the first and only fraternity for collegiate dance students in the association.

== Symbols ==
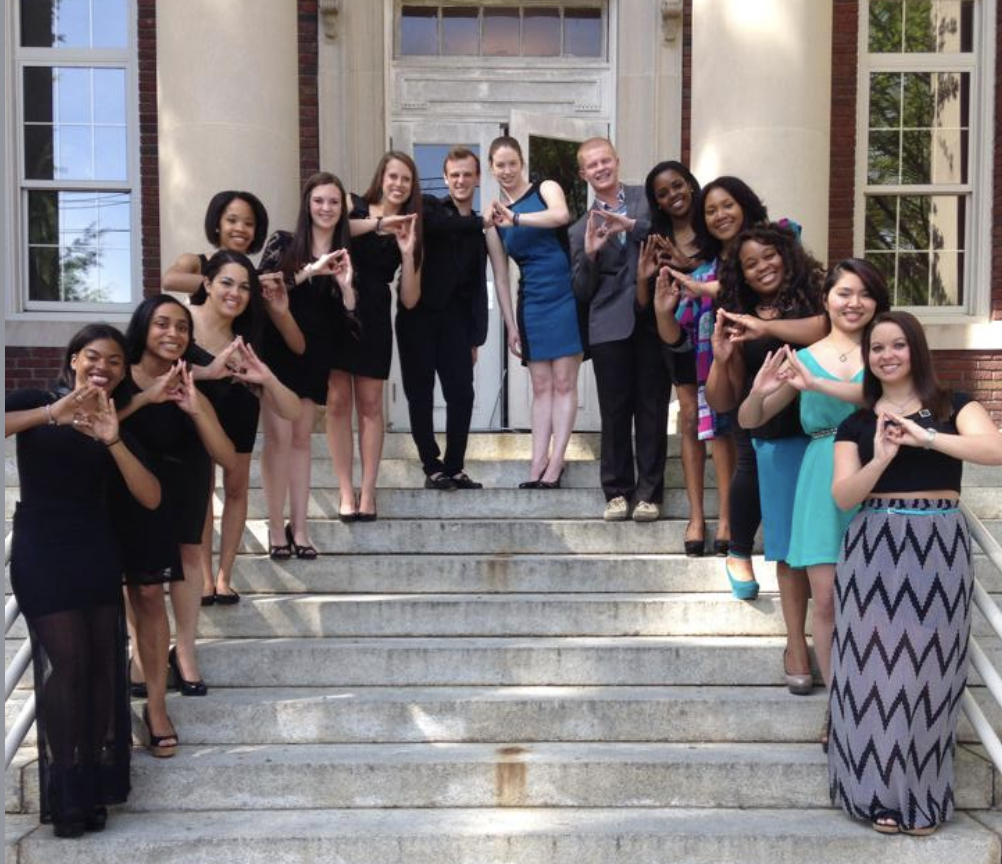
Members of the Alpha chapter of Delta Chi Xi at the University of North Carolina at Greensboro in 2014.

Delta Chi Xi's colors are royal purple and teal. Purple is symbolic of royalty, power, nobility, and ambition; it is also associated with wisdom and creativity. Teal represents sophistication, uniqueness, guidance, and leadership.

The official symbol of Delta Chi Xi is a combined sun and spiral to represent the unity and connection between dance, service, and academics. The sun is depicted by a silhouette of a dancer in a 'C jump' pose with fourteen spirals as sun rays to represent the fourteen original charter members.

Its motto is "Live, Love, Dance". Its nicknames are DCX and Chi Xis.

== Activities ==
Delta Chi Xi hosts a national conference, DanCe fluX, every year at the University of Maryland. The conference includes master classes taught by guest artists, activities for fellowship among members of different chapters, and a dance concert.

== Chapters ==
=== Collegiate ===
The following is a list of the collegiate chapters of Delta Chi Xi. Active chapters are noted in bold. Inactive chapters are noted in italics.

Chapter	Charter date and range	Institution	Location	Status	Ref.
**Alpha**	April 20, 2010	University of North Carolina at Greensboro	Greensboro, North Carolina	Active	
**Beta**	November 13, 2011	Morehead State University	Morehead, Kentucky	Active	
**Gamma**	May 8, 2012	University of Maryland	College Park, Maryland	Active	
**Delta**	November 4, 2012	Coppin State University	Baltimore, Maryland	Active	
**Epsilon**	November 24, 2013	Elon University	Elon, North Carolina	Active	
Zeta	November 7, 2015 – 201x ?	Morgan State University	Baltimore, Maryland	Inactive	
**Eta**	December 9, 2018	Northern Kentucky University	Highland Heights, Kentucky	Active	
**Theta**	May 5, 2019	University of Tampa	Tampa, Florida	Active	

=== Alumni ===
Chapter	Charter date	Status	Ref.
North Carolina	April 22, 2012	Active	

=== Notable alumni ===
- Jeffrey Page, choreographer and dancer - awarded honorary membership in 2015
- Asiel Hardison, commercial dancer - awarded honorary membership in 2016

== See also ==
- Professional fraternities and sororities
