= Alvena Storm =

Alvena (Suhl) Storm (March 10, 1902 – June 11, 2003) was the American Professor Emerita of Geography at San Diego State University (1926-1966) and a founding member of the department, serving as department chair. She was considered an expert in the geography of the Western United States.

== Early life ==
Alvena Suhl (later Storm) was born on March 10, 1902, in Pendleton, Oregon, United States, to German immigrant parents.

== Education ==
Alvena Storm received both her bachelor's and master's degrees in geography from the University of California, Berkeley where she studied with Carl Sauer. Her Master's thesis focused on the San Diego region. She wished to pursue a doctorate, but was denied admission to the PhD program because of her gender. She was awarded an honorary doctorate by San Diego State University in 1996.

== Career ==
Storm first gained experience after completing her sophomore year at the Umatilla Indian Reservation in Oregon, after which she returned to Berkeley to complete her degrees. She moved to San Diego in 1925 and joined the faculty at Roosevelt Junior High School in Balboa Park. The following year, Alvena Storm became an assistant professor at San Diego State Teaching College (later San Diego State University) in 1926. She served on the board of directors of the Museum of Man for over 15 years.

== Honors ==
She was awarded an Academic Achievement Award by the American Association of University Professors in 1958. For her contributions to the university, the west wing of the social sciences buildings at San Diego State University was named in her honor in 1986. She was also awarded an honorary doctorate from SDSU in 1996.
