= Beyond Toxics =

American environmental organization

- Formation: 2000; 26 years ago
- Type: Nonprofit
- Tax ID no.: 93-1294227
- Legal status: 501(c)(3)
- Purpose: Environmental advocacy
- Headquarters: Eugene, Oregon
- Interim President: Mira Mason-Reader
- Website: https://www.beyondtoxics.org/

Beyond Toxics is a nonprofit environmental justice organization based in Eugene, Oregon. Dedicated to ending environmental threats to vulnerable communities, Beyond Toxics supports environmental quality, protection, and justice across the state. It focuses largely on reducing air pollution, decreasing pesticide use, and advocating for climate justice.

== History ==
In 1996, the city of Eugene, Oregon created the Eugene Toxics Right-to-Know program. This program required manufacturers to communicate to the public about the use and disposal of hazardous substances. The law inspired Mary O'Brien, Anita Johnson, Michael Carrigan and Steve Johnson to "form an organization dedicated to toxics use reduction and environmental justice," leading to the founding of Beyond Toxics in 2000.

== Mission ==
Beyond Toxics' representatives believe community members have a right to know what they are breathing, how pollutants impact their health, and how to communicate directly with corporations to address problems. The organization has hosted environmental justice webinars aimed at educating communities about the intersections between clean air, environmental justice, and racial justice and how concerned residents might take action. The organization seeks to increase awareness about local air quality by hosting community meetings and providing residents with lists of chemicals emitted by local factories. Beyond Toxics has attempted to mitigate harms by factory emissions, specifically targeting a wood treatment plant, JH Baxter, for pollution and improper waste disposal.

== Campaigns ==
=== Air pollution and J.H. Baxter in West Eugene ===
J.H. Baxter & Co., a wood treatment plant, is one of 32 corporate facilities in West Eugene that emit toxins like creosote, methanol, acetone, and benzene, contaminating local air, soil, and groundwater. Exposure to these chemicals can lead to diabetes, stroke, and depression. West Eugene has a higher proportion of people of color and low-income residents than other parts of the city. The Oregon Department of Environmental Quality accused J.H. Baxter of improperly using retorts (or furnaces) to burn off toxic process waste. Family members of children diagnosed with asthma and cancer in West Eugene have voiced concerns about the factory's pollution. Beyond Toxics sent a letter to Lane Regional Air Protection Agency and the Oregon Department of Environmental Quality on May 3, 2021, in response to two class-action lawsuits filed against J.H. Baxter, urging the agencies to take residents' concerns about J.H. Baxter seriously.

=== Pesticide use reforms ===
Beyond Toxics advocates for reducing the use of pesticides. They have conducted research on pesticide leakage into food, schools, parks, and waterways. Beyond Toxics aims to reform pesticide use through community involvement and legislation.

One of Beyond Toxics' campaigns has involved neonicotinoid pesticides, believed to be contributing to the decline in bee populations. Neonicotinoids are absorbed into plants and pollen, threatening bees and other insects. In 2014 and 2016, Beyond Toxics gathered plant samples from 18 U.S. and Canadian stores. Fifty-one percent of them contained neonicotinoid pesticides. In 2019, they also collected samples from Eugene grocery stores, finding pesticides in 100 percent of the apple sauces and cereals tested.

To reduce pesticide use, Beyond Toxics has hosted workshops in Jackson County and Lane County, teaching low-cost methods that protect soil, pollinators, and the environment. Beyond Toxics successfully campaigned for a ban on neonicotinoids in Eugene, Oregon. The organization also assisted the University of Oregon's Bee Friendly Committee in creating a bee-friendly campus, limiting insect controls and educating students about pollinators.

=== Legislation ===
Beyond Toxics also advocates for new legislation that provides equal protection of marginalized and underrepresented community members. In 2021, they supported Oregon's HB 2488, which did not pass, but attempted to remove "outdated and offensive statutory language" from the state's land-use planning law to establish inclusive dialogue on how Oregon uses land.

Beyond Toxics has also endorsed bills like SB 853 and HB 3058 that attempt to prohibit aerial spraying over state forests, as well as pesticides like chlorpyrifos and neonicotinoids. Although neither of these bills have passed, Beyond Toxics continues to advocate for stricter laws around pesticides, specifically those that harm bees.

Beyond Toxics also offers support and protection to immigrant workers, particularly those in forestry. Pablo Alvarez, Beyond Toxics' community organizer, asserted that most immigrant workers do not receive proper care or training and are exposed to herbicides and pesticides, creating dangerous working conditions. Beyond Toxics has worked with the Occupational Safety and Health Administration and legislation to directly combat these inequities.

=== Oregon's Green New Deal ===
In 2019, both Beyond Toxics and the Eugene-Springfield chapter of the NAACP joined Oregon's Green New Deal.
