= Younger Women's Task Force =

Organization for women's rights

The Younger Women's Task Force (YWTF) is an affiliate organization of the American Association of University Women. Founded in 2004, YWTF is committed to promoting and implementing programs and policies for the benefit, empowerment, and growth of women aged 20–39 so that they may thrive as productive, active, healthy, and prominent contributors in their communities and personal lives. It consists of 12 chapters with a total claimed membership of 3500.

Its stated goals are to:

- Provide a stronger voice in the policy making process for women in their 20s and 30s;
- Increase the impact of younger women activists through the articulation of, and collaboration on, a common agenda;
- Create a culture of inclusion where decision-making and power are practiced collectively, and members from diverse backgrounds participate in all levels of YWTF;
- Define and develop the next generation of women leaders;
- Create a local and national network for peer mentoring, networking and sharing resources.

YWTF chapters have worked on a number of issues including increasing younger women's access to information about real estate, ratifying the Equal Rights Amendment and encouraging younger women to run for political office. YWTF recently announced a Media Democracy Project, a program intended to increase American young women’s ability to create their own media through alternative means.
