= League of Women Voters =

Voter education and advocacy organization

League of Women Voters of the United States
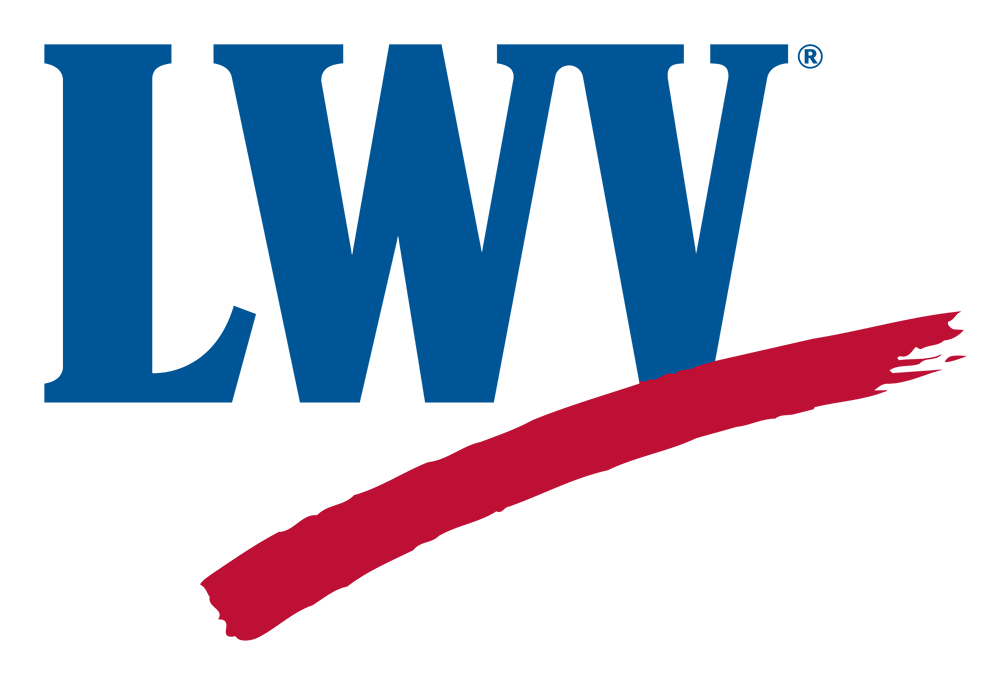
- Founded: February 14, 1920; 106 years ago
- Type: Nonprofit
- Purpose: Political education and advocacy
- Location: Washington, D.C.
- President: Sania Irwin
- Revenue: $8.13 million (2024)
- Website: LWV.org

The League of Women Voters (LWV) is a non-partisan American nonprofit political organization. Founded in 1920, its ongoing major activities include registering voters, providing voter information, boosting voter turnout and advocating for voting rights. In addition, the LWV works with partners for specific campaigns including support for campaign finance reform, women's rights, health care reform and gun control.

The League was founded as the successor to the National American Woman Suffrage Association, which had led the nationwide fight for women's suffrage. The initial goals of the League were to educate women to take part in the political process and to push forward legislation of interest to women. As a nonpartisan organization, an important part of its role in American politics has been to register and inform voters, but it also lobbies for issues of importance to its members, which are selected at its biennial conventions. Its effectiveness has been attributed to its policy of careful study and documentation of an issue before taking a position. Its bylaws do not allow it to endorse candidates or political parties. In the Trump era, the strong response by the league to political polarization and core issues such as voting rights has weakened support for it on the right.

== Activities ==
=== VOTE411.org ===
VOTE411.org is a nonpartisan bilingual website in English and Spanish that allows voters to input their address and get candidate and election information tailored to their location. Candidate survey responses to three questions specific to the office are included on the site. The League of Women Voters, including state and local leagues, runs the site which received a 2020 Webby Award.

=== National Voter Registration Day ===
In 2012, LWV created National Voter Registration Day, a day when volunteers work to register voters and increase participation.

=== Sponsoring debates ===
State and local leagues host candidate debates to provide candidates' positions at all levels of government.

== History ==
=== Founding ===
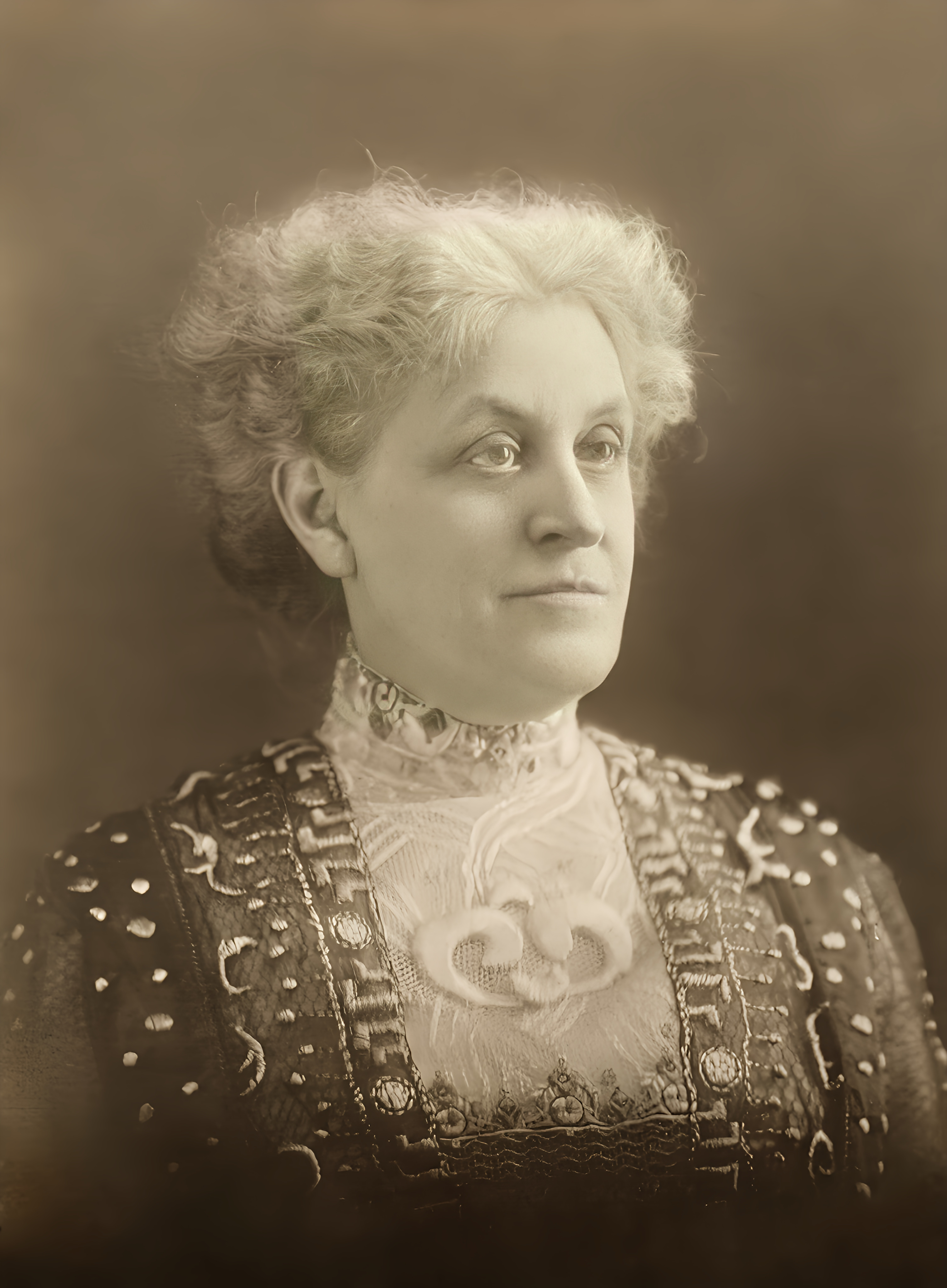
Founder Carrie Chapman Catt

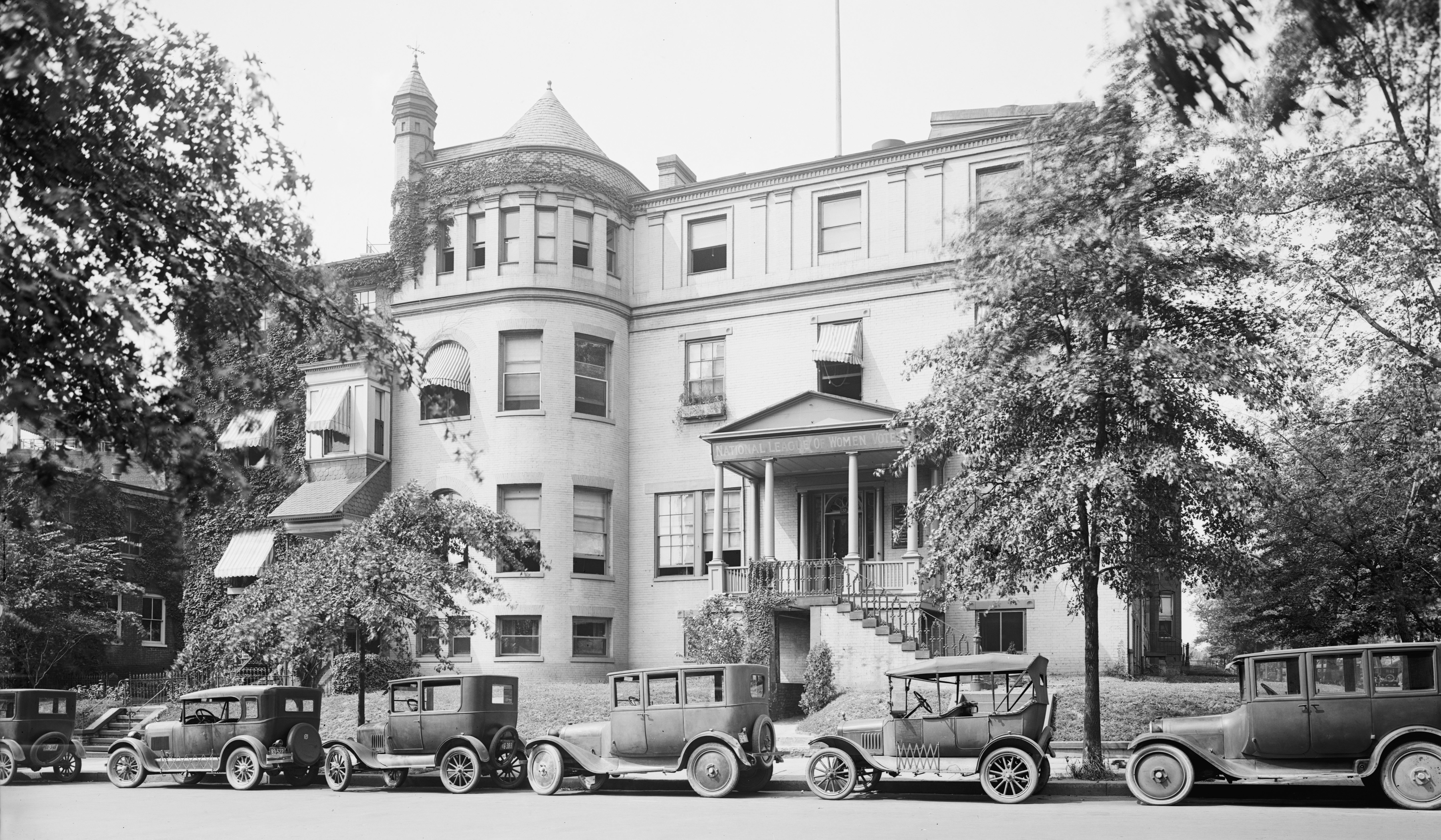
Headquarters building in Washington, DC, circa 1920s

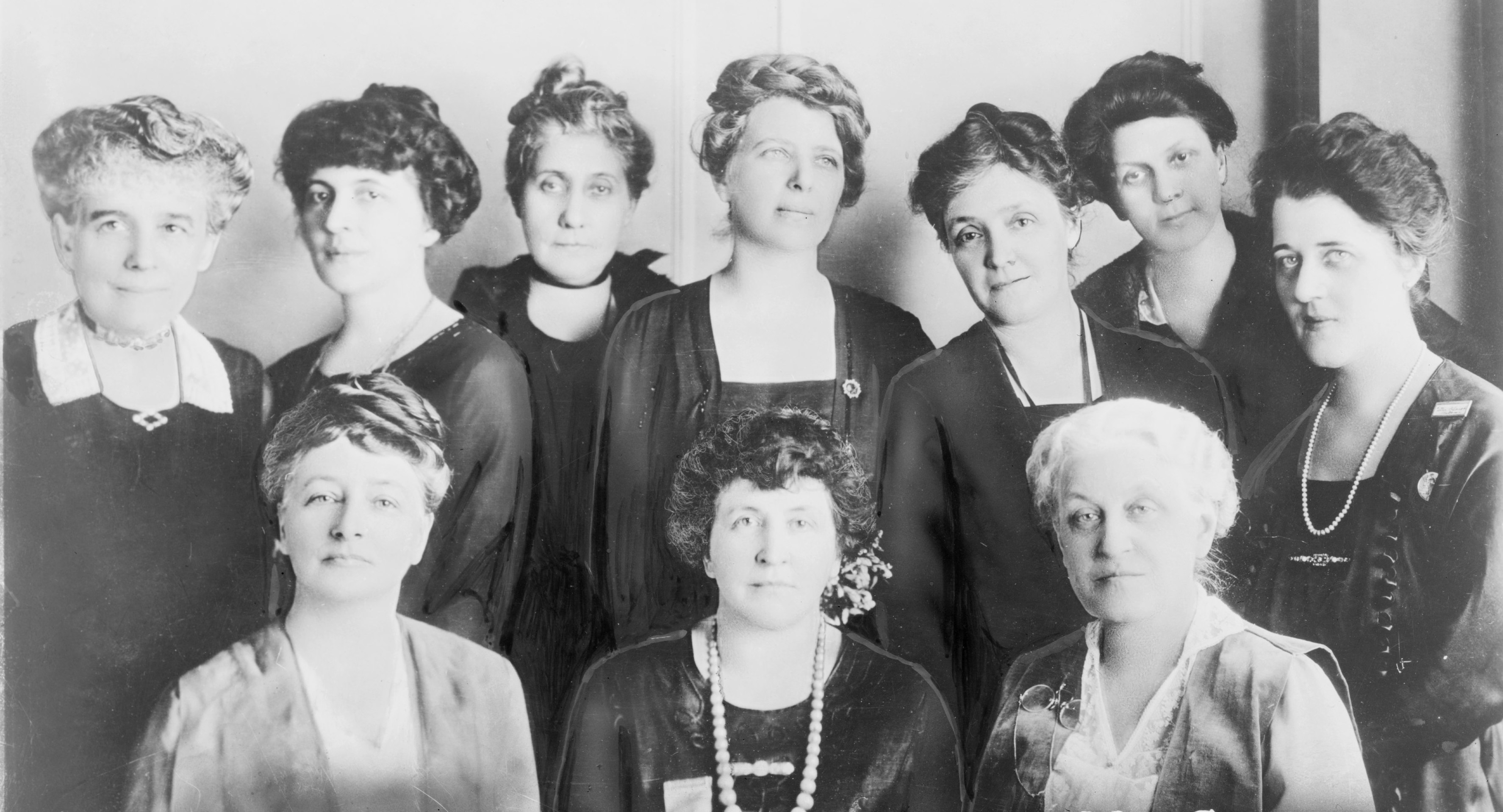
Board of Directors, 1920

The League of Women Voters was created in 1920 as the merger of two existing organizations, the long-established National American Woman Suffrage Association (NAWSA) and the National Council of Women Voters (NCWV).

The founding goals of the National League of Women Voters were to educate women on election processes and lobby for favorable legislation on women's issues. These were the same as the goals of the NCWV, which had been founded by Emma Smith DeVoe after her proposal for such an organization was rebuffed at the 1909 National American Woman Suffrage Association (NAWSA) convention in Seattle. When her proposal was ignored, DeVoe founded the National Council of Women Voters in 1911. She recruited western suffragists and organizations to join the NCWV.

Ten years later, prior to the 1919 Convention of the NAWSA (in St. Louis, Missouri), Carrie Chapman Catt began negotiating with DeVoe to merge her organization with a new league that would be the successor to the NAWSA. Even though continuing as the NCWV might have made sense because the goals were essentially those that Catt proposed for the new organization, Catt was concerned that DeVoe's alignment with the more radical Alice Paul might discourage conservative women from joining it and thus proposed the formation of a new league. In founding the League of Women Voters, Catt sought to create a political process that was rational and issue-oriented, dominated by citizens, not politicians. She feared that alliance with political parties would reduce the independence of these organizations and swallow up their concerns in more partisan concerns. In addition, by endorsing one candidate the organization would inevitably lose the support of the opposing candidate. As fifteen states had already ratified the Nineteenth Amendment to the United States Constitution, the women wanted to move forward with a plan to educate women on the voting process and shepherd their participation.

A motion was made at the 1919 NAWSA convention to merge the two organizations into a successor, the National League of Women Voters. Although not all members of either organization were in favor of a merger, the merger was officially completed on January 6, 1920. For the first year the league operated as a committee of the NAWSA. The formal organization of the League was drafted at the 1920 Convention held in Chicago.

In her presidential address on March 24, 1919, at the above-mentioned NAWSA convention, Catt had said:

Let us raise up a League of Women Voters—the name and form of organization to be determined by the voters themselves; a League that shall be non-partisan and non-sectarian in character and that shall be consecrated to three chief aims:

- To use its utmost influence to secure the final enfranchisement of the women of every state in our own Republic and to reach out across the seas in aid of the women's struggle for her own in every land.
- To remove the remaining legal discriminations against women in the codes and constitutions of the several states in order that the feet of coming women may find these stumbling blocks removed.
- To make our democracy so safe for the Nation and so safe for the world, that every citizen may feel secure and great men will acknowledge the worthiness of the American Republic to lead.”

Carrie Chapman Catt was named honorary chairman of the League instead of president because she insisted that it was for younger and fresher women to lead the new work.

As time passed, women's political organizations did find that political parties redefined issues of concern to them as "women's issues" and pushed them aside.

Throughout the first part of its history, the League of Women Voters was not welcoming to women of color and its predecessor NAWSA ignored issues involving race due to fears that it would reduce support for women's suffrage.

In subsequent years, due to the increasing influence of women in politics, the league has evolved a more inclusive mission, to "protect and expand voting rights and ensure everyone is represented in our democracy."

=== 1920–1930 ===
The issues of primary concern to the League in the 1920s were extending the Sheppard–Towner Act first passed in 1921, a Child Labor Amendment to the Constitution, and voter education.

The Sheppard–Towner Act, first passed in 1921, provided federal subsidies to those states that provided education in maternity and infant care. It was initially slated for five years, and was twice extended in the 1920s, but finally failed to pass in 1929.

On October 17, 1929, Belle Sherwin, the president of the League of Women Voters, and Ruth Morgan of New York City headed a delegation to ask President Herbert Hoover to support the renewal of Federal aid to the States in maternity and infancy work. It was later revived as part of the Social Security Act of 1935.

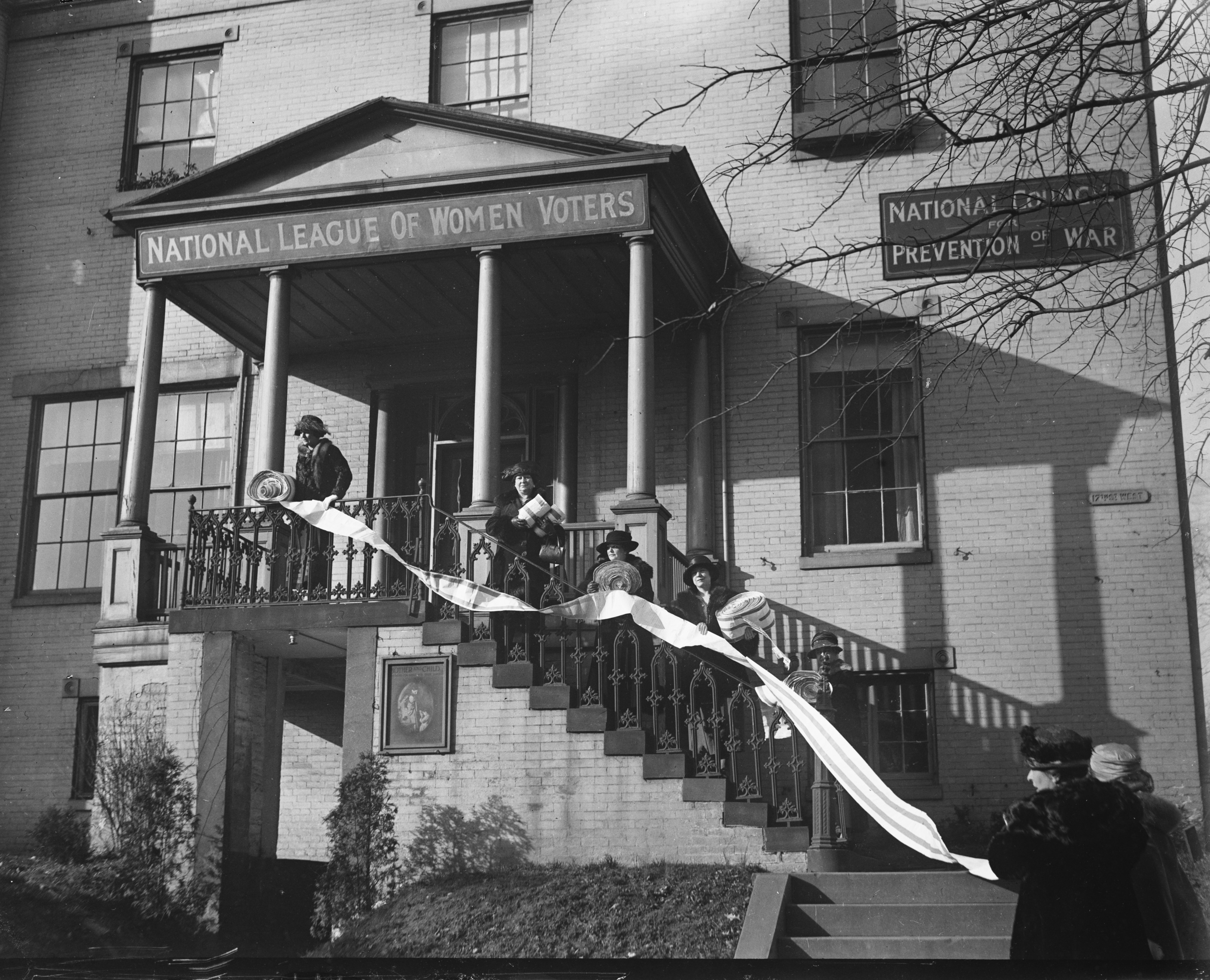
Minnesota delegation at Washington, DC headquarters, 1923

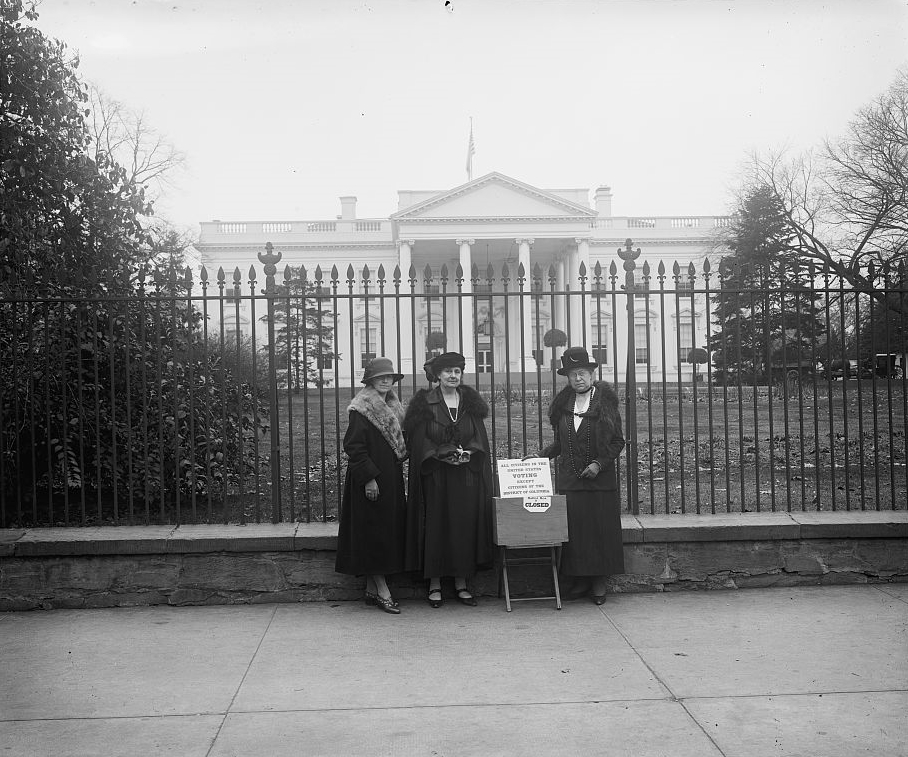
League of Women Voters members in front of the White House, 1924

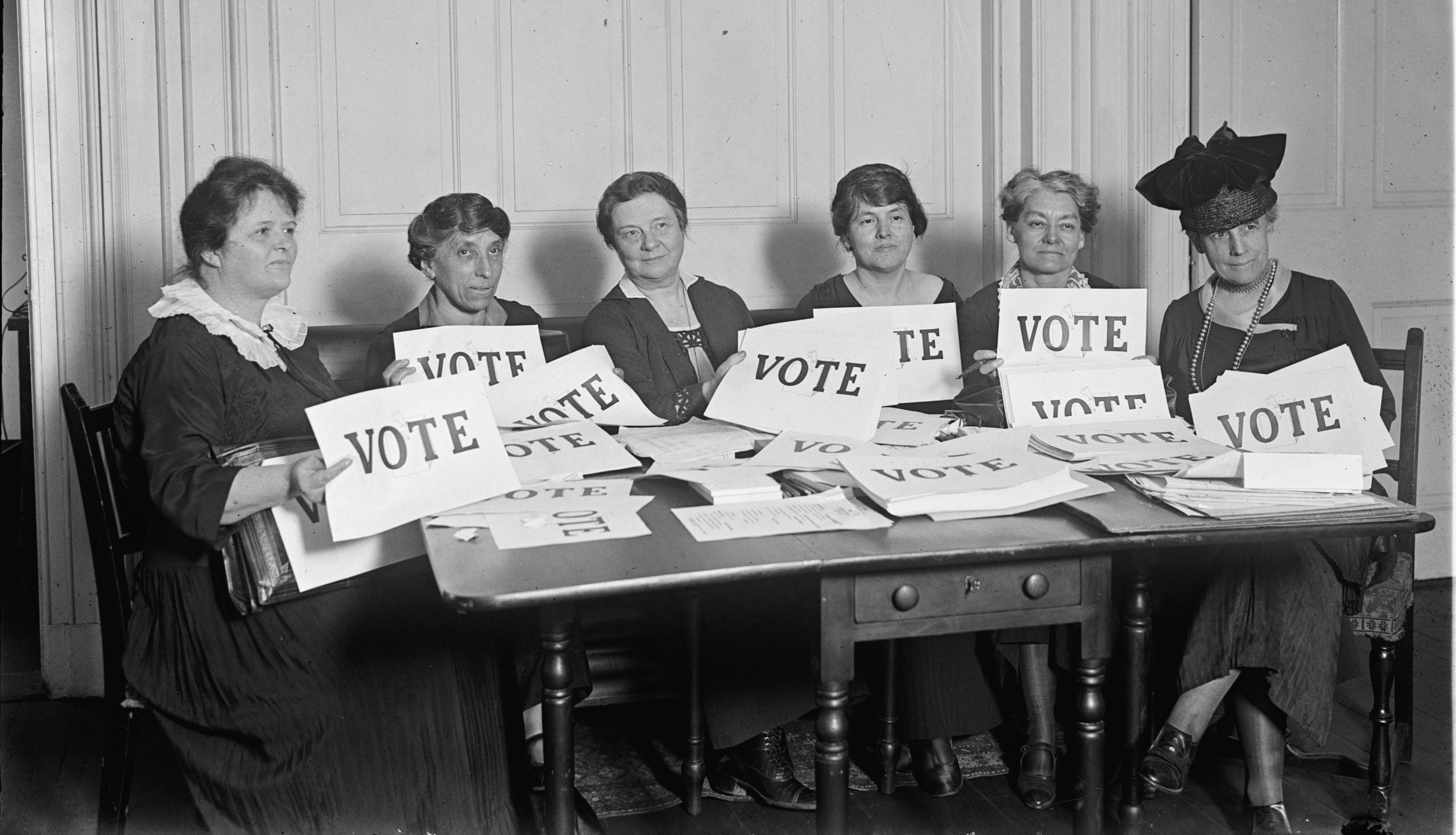
Get out the vote in 1924

In 1923, a special committee of the national League of Women Voters picked twelve women as the "greatest living American women". They were Jane Addams, Cecilia Beaux, Annie Jump Cannon, Carrie Chapman Catt, Anna Botsford Comstock, Minnie Maddern Fiske, Louise Homer, Julia Lathrop, Florence Rena Sabin, M. Carey Thomas, Martha Van Rensselaer, and Edith Wharton.

At the 1926 convention of the national League, Belle Sherwin, the League president, emphasized education in politics as the right road toward true democracy.

Whether it is possible to develop in this country an education which will qualify citizens to be partners in government is a question to face squarely. For many, education today is either remote and limited to a brief period or is highly specialized for vocational purposes. Education for active citizenship has hardly been tried.

She went on to mention "the modest attempts of schools here and there to teach critical reading of the newspapers and other means of avoiding mob-mindedness." Prohibition and birth control were hot issues that year, but were not included in the subjects for study and legislation during the ensuing year.

In 1926, The New York League together with the Women's National Republican Club established information booths in seven department stores, explaining to women how to register to vote, and installed a voting machine at League headquarters to demonstrate how to vote. The League members explained literacy tests and requirements and hours for registration. A frequent question involved the status of an American woman married to an immigrant. The League also presented a series of pre-election talks, including a talk on "National and State Legislators", "The Judiciary", and "Machinery of Elections".

At the 1929 convention of the League of Women Voters of New York, the members voted for a New York State prohibition enforcement act. They also voted to favor old age pensions and ask the Legislature to give women the right to do jury service, to permit physicians to give contraceptive information to married persons, and to extend the benefits of workmen's compensation for all occupational diseases.

During the 1920s, the League of Women Voters of New York sent an annual questionnaire to candidates for local office, and published the answers in the publication "Information for Voters". In 1929, the questionnaire covered maintaining the 5 cent subway fare, creation of a permanent city planning board, immediate action on a sewage and waste disposal plant, unlimited building heights in certain districts, and reclassification of civil service employees to provide automatic salary increases.

In the 1930s, the League was supportive of New Deal programs such as Social Security and the Food and Drug Acts.

=== 1940–1969 ===
In 1945, the League advocated for the United Nations, the World Bank, and the International Monetary Fund, and was recognized by the UN as a permanent observer, giving it access to most meetings and relevant documentation.

In the 1950s, League member Dorothy Kenyon was attacked as a Communist by Joseph McCarthy and president Percy Maxim Lee testified before Congress against Senator Joseph McCarthy's abuse of congressional investigative powers.

In 1960, the League supported the Resources and Conservation Act of 1960 (S. 2549), beginning a long history of environmental engagement.

The league ultimately supported the Civil Rights Act of 1964 and the Voting Rights Act of 1965, but their efforts came too late to have major impact. After first refusing to oppose discrimination in housing in 1966, the 1968 program included opposition to discrimination in housing and support for presidential suffrage for citizens of Washington, DC.

In 1969, the League was one of the first organizations in the United States calling for normalizing relations with China.

=== 1970–2000 ===
In the 1970s, after years of opposition to the Equal Rights Amendment as proposed by the National Woman's Party, the League offered support to an Equal Rights Amendment.

In 1974, the League began to admit men.

In 1975, a bill entitled "The Indian Law Enforcement Improvement Act" was introduced in the Senate and supported by the League of Women Voters of Nebraska, saying "We support self determination and therefore self government of all citizens, in this case Native Americans." After two days of hearings, the bill was not reported out of committee.

The LWV sponsored the United States presidential debates in 1976, 1980 and 1984. On October 2, 1988, the LWV's 14 trustees voted unanimously to pull out of the debates, and on October 3 they issued a press release condemning the demands of the major candidates' campaigns. LWV President Nancy Neuman said that the debate format would "perpetrate a fraud on the American voter" and that the organization did not intend to "become an accessory to the hoodwinking of the American public." All presidential debates from 1988 until 2020 were sponsored by the Commission on Presidential Debates, a bipartisan organization run by the two major parties that some argue has established rules with the intent to exclude airing candidates associated with other parties.

In 1998, the League elected its first African-American president, Carolyn Jefferson-Jenkins. She served two terms, until 2002, and wrote a book "The untold story of women of color in the League of Women Voters" documenting the history of the League and women of color.

The League fought for the 1982 Amendments to the Voting Rights Act and in the 1990s was important in the passage of National Voter Registration Act of 1993, popularly known as the Motor Voter Act. The act requires states to offer voter registration at all driver's license agencies, at social service agencies, and through the mail.

=== 2000–present ===
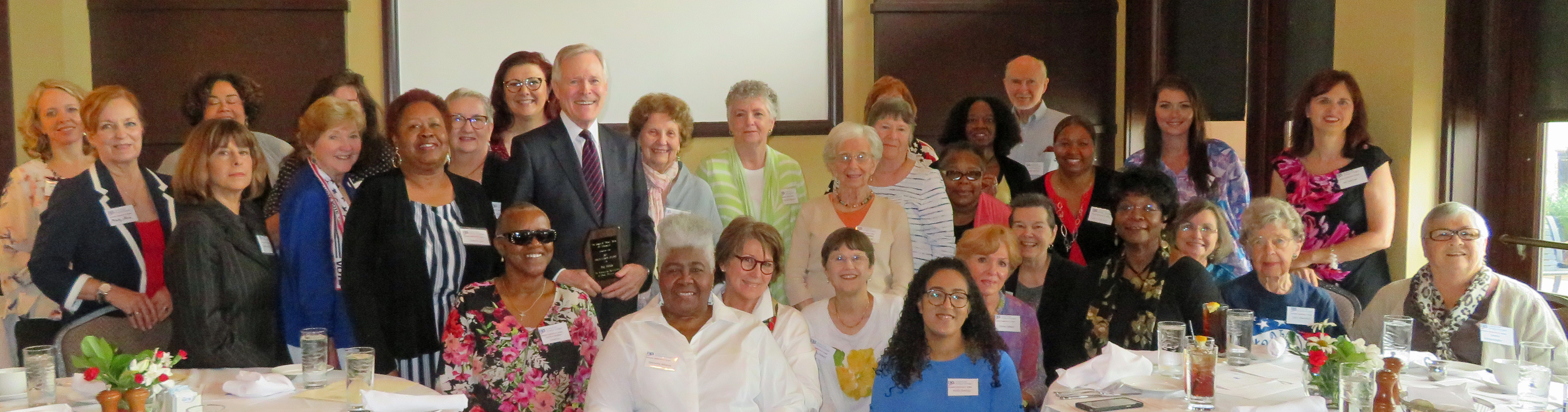
League of Women Voters of Mississippi, 2017

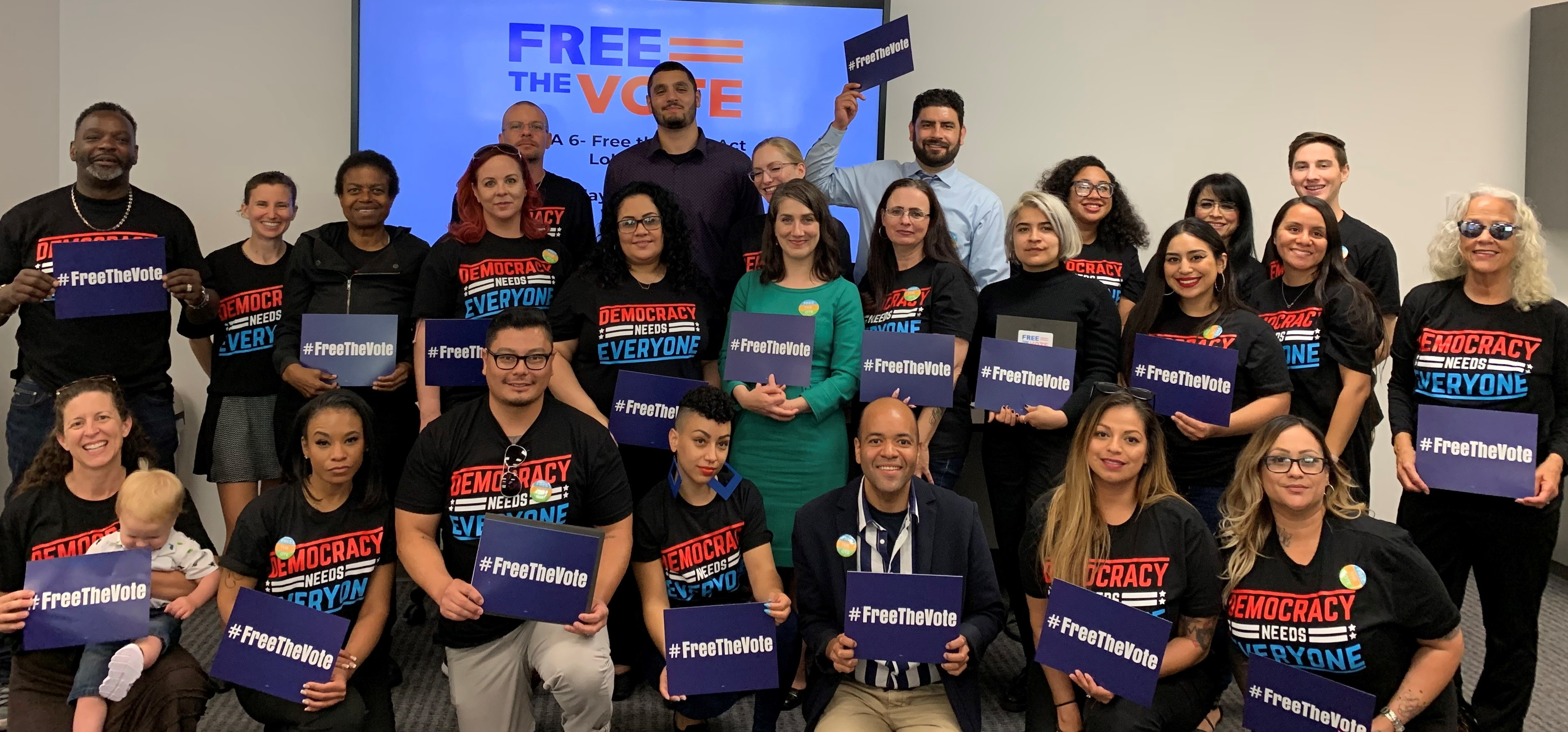
California Free the Vote campaign, 2019

In 2002, the League supported the Help America Vote Act (with some reservations about the final compromise) and the Bipartisan Campaign Finance Reform Act.

In 2014, the League sponsored voter guides including Smart Voter and Voter's Edge in collaboration with MapLight.

In 2018, the league took an extraordinary step in opposing Brett Kavanaugh's confirmation due in part to his sexual assault allegations and fears around judicial independence.

In 2020, the League of Women Voters supported Native Americans in seeking to remove restrictions on ballot delivery from reservations.

The Native American voting rights group Four Directions filed a suit on behalf of six voters from the Navajo Nation asking the court to extend the deadline for Arizona counties to receive the ballots of voters, because of "lack of home mail delivery, the need for language translation, lack of access to public transportation and lack of access to any vehicle." The court declined to extend the deadline due to lack of standing of the plaintiffs.

The League of Women Voters of Arizona filed an amicus curiae, saying that:

Most Arizonans take access to mail receipt and delivery as a given. By contrast, the District Court recognized the painful reality that "several variables make voting by mail difficult" for Native American voters. More specifically, "[m]ost Navajo Nation residents do not have access to standard mail service," including home delivery, and must travel "lengthy distance[s]" to access postal services – a burden compounded by "socioeconomic factors."

In 2021, the League of Women Voters of Florida partnered with VoteRiders to get word out to eligible voters about the changes made due to Florida Senate Bill 90, signed into law in May 2021. The Florida League also partnered with the Black Voters Matter Fund and the Florida Alliance for Retired Americans to file lawsuits against the changes. The trial court struck down multiple provisions of the law but the 11th U.S. Circuit Court of Appeals issued a stay reinstating the restrictive law.

After the United States Capitol attack of January 6, 2021, the league's board called Trump a "tyrannical despot" and advocated his removal by legal means. This, among other positions such as around transgender rights and police accountability, have led more Republicans to criticize the league and not respond to VOTE411 candidate surveys. Some Republican-led states have been making voter registration more difficult, prompting the league to stop registering voters in Kansas, for example, for fear of its members facing prosecution. Law professor and election law expert Richard Hasen has argued that it has become difficult for the League to be seen as neutral when voting rights, a foundational issue for the league, have been made into a seemingly partisan issue.

== Policy views ==
The League lobbies for legislation at the national, state, and local levels. Positions on national issues are determined by decisions at the most recent national convention. Members of state and local leagues determine their leagues' positions on state and local issues, consistent with the national positions.

The League was founded by suffragists fighting for the right of women to vote and has always been concerned with issues around voting and representative government. Other issue areas in which the League currently advocates are international relations, natural resources, and social policy.

=== Voting and representative government ===
LWV members discussing DC statehood in 2024

In 1993, the League pushed for the adoption of the National Voter Registration Act of 1993, which requires states to offer voter registration at all driver's license agencies, at social service agencies, and through the mail.

The League works with the non-partisan VoteRiders organization to spread state-specific information on voter ID requirements. In 2002, the League endorsed passage of the Bipartisan Campaign Reform Act, which banned soft money in federal elections and made other reforms in campaign finance laws. It was also a major proponent of the Help America Vote Act.

In 2010, the League opposed the Supreme Court decision Citizens United v. Federal Election Commission, which removed limits on corporate contributions to candidates. It filed an amicus brief in support of the FEC.

The League supports the DISCLOSE Act, which would provide for greater and faster public disclosure of campaign spending and combat the use of "dark money" in U.S. elections.

The League currently opposes restrictive photo ID laws and supports campaign finance reform in the United States, including public financing of elections, restrictions on spending by candidates, and abolishing super-PACs.

=== International relations ===
The League lobbied for the establishment of the United Nations, and later became one of the first groups to receive status as a nongovernmental organization with the U.N. The League was active from the beginning in promoting world peace and international organizations.

=== Natural resources ===
The League supported the Clean Air Act, the Clean Water Act, the Safe Drinking Water Act, the Resource Conservation and Recovery Act and the Kyoto Protocol. The League opposes the proposed Keystone Pipeline project. In January 2013, the League of Women Voters in Hawaii urged President Obama to take action on climate change under the authority given him by the Clean Air Act of 1963.

=== Social policy ===
The League opposes school vouchers. In 1999, the League of Women Voters of Florida challenged a Florida law that allowed students to use school vouchers to attend other schools.

The League supports universal health care and endorses both Medicaid expansion and the Affordable Care Act.

The League supports the abolition of the death penalty.

=== LGBT+ rights ===
LWV supports LGBT+ rights and has stated that "defending our democracy and ending discrimination against the LGBTQ+ community go hand in hand." It has also supported the participation of transgender athletes in girls' and women's sports.

== Governance ==
=== National ===
A national board of directors consisting of four officers, eight elected directors, and not more than eight board-appointed directors, most of whom reside in the Metro Washington DC area, govern the League subject to the Bylaws of the League of Women Voters of the United States. The national board is elected at the national convention and sets position policy.

=== State and local leagues ===
Local Leagues and state Leagues are organized in order to promote the purposes of the League and to take action on local and state governmental matters. These Leagues (chapters) have their own directors and officers. The national board may withdraw recognition from any state or local League for failure to fulfill recognition requirements.

The League of Women Voters has state and local leagues in all 50 states, the District of Columbia, Puerto Rico, the Virgin Islands, and Hong Kong.

== See also ==
- List of notable members of the League of Women Voters
- List of women's clubs
- National Organization for Women
