= AYG =

AYG or ayg may refer to:

- Asian Youth Games, a multi-sport event held every four years among athletes from all over Asia
- Australian Young Greens, the youth wing of the Australian Greens
- Ginyanga language (ISO 639-3: ayg), a Guang language of Togo
- Yaguara Airport (IATA: AYG), Yaguara, Colombia; See List of airports by IATA airport code: A
