= Australian Greens =

Political party

- Abbreviation: AG; GRN
- Leader: David Shoebridge
- Deputy Leader: Steph Hodgins-May
- Founded: 1992; 34 years ago
- Headquarters: Braddon, Australian Capital Territory
- Newspaper: Green Magazine
- Think tank: The Green Institute
- Youth wing: Young Greens
- Membership (2020): ▲15,000
- Ideology: Green politics; Progressivism; Left-wing populism
- Political position: Left-wing
- Regional affiliation: Asia-Pacific Greens
- International affiliation: Global Greens
- Colours: Green
- Slogan: A Future for All of Us
- Governing body: National Council
- Constituent parties: ACT; NSW; NT; Qld; SA; Tas; Vic; WA
- House of Representatives: 1 / 150
- Senate: 10 / 76
- State and territory governments: 0 / 8
- State and territory lower houses (Note: Any state or territory legislatures): 17 / 465
- State upper houses: 14 / 156

Party flag

Website
- greens.org.au

The Australian Greens, commonly referred to simply as the Greens, are a left-wing green Australian political party. As of 2025, the Greens are the third-largest political party in Australia by vote and the fourth-largest by elected representation.

The party was formed in 1992 as a confederation of eight state and territorial parties. In their early years, the party was largely built around the personality of well-known Tasmanian politician Bob Brown, before expanding its representation substantially in the early part of the 21st century. The party cites four core values as its ideology, namely ecological sustainability, social justice, grassroots democracy, and peace and non-violence. The party's origins can be traced to the early environmental movement in Australia, the Franklin Dam controversy, the Green bans, and the nuclear disarmament movement. The party began with the United Tasmania Group, one of the first green parties in the world.

At the 2025 federal election, the Greens lost 3 of their previous 4 representatives in the House of Representatives and retained all 11 of their Senate seats. In 2020, the party had c. 15,000 members.

== History ==
=== Formation ===
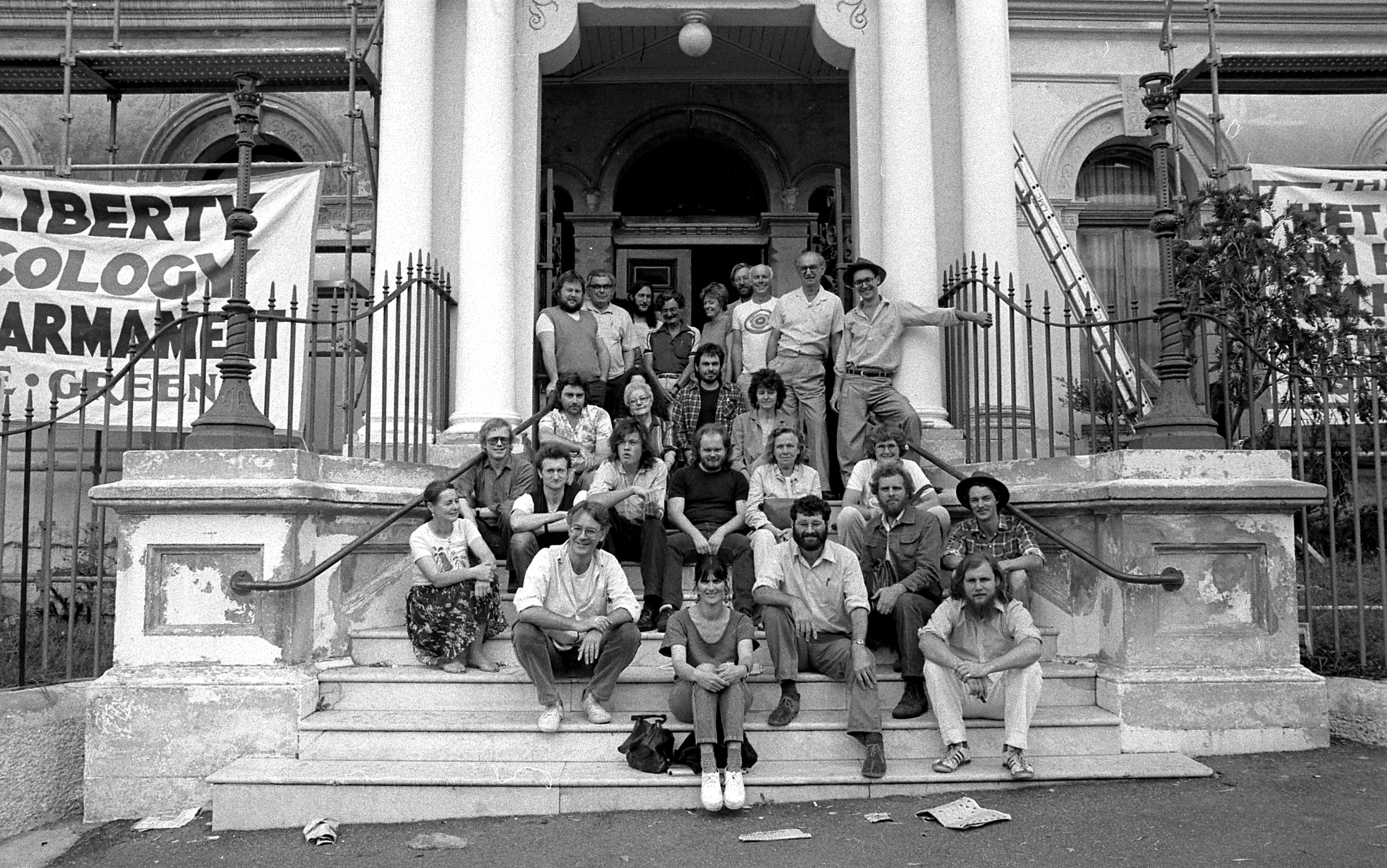
Sydney Greens in the 1980s, the first political party in Australia to use the label Green.

The origins of the Australian Greens can be traced to the early environmental movement in Australia and the formation of the United Tasmania Group, one of the first green parties in the world, but also the nuclear disarmament movement in Western Australia and sections of the industrial left in New South Wales who were inspired by the Builders Labourers Federation Green bans in Sydney. Co-ordination between environmentalist groups occurred in the 1980s with various significant protests. Key people involved in these campaigns included Bob Brown and Christine Milne, who went on to contest and win seats in the Parliament of Tasmania and eventually form the Tasmanian Greens. Both Brown and Milne subsequently became leaders of the federal party.

The formation of the federal party in 1992 brought together over a dozen green groups, from state and local organisations, some of which had existed for 20 years. Following the formation of the national party in 1992, regional emphasis variations remained within the Greens, with members of the "industrial left" remaining a presence in the New South Wales branch. Brown resigned from the Tasmanian Parliament in 1993, and in 1996 he was elected as a senator for Tasmania, the first elected as an Australian Greens candidate.

Initially, the most successful Greens group during this period was The Greens (WA), which was still a separate organisation from the Australian Greens at the time. Vallentine was succeeded by Christabel Chamarette in 1992, and she was joined by Dee Margetts in 1993. However, Chamarette was defeated in the 1996 federal election. Margetts lost her seat in the 1998 federal election, leaving Brown as the sole Australian Greens senator.

=== Bob Brown's leadership (2001–2012) ===
==== 2001 election and 39th parliament ====
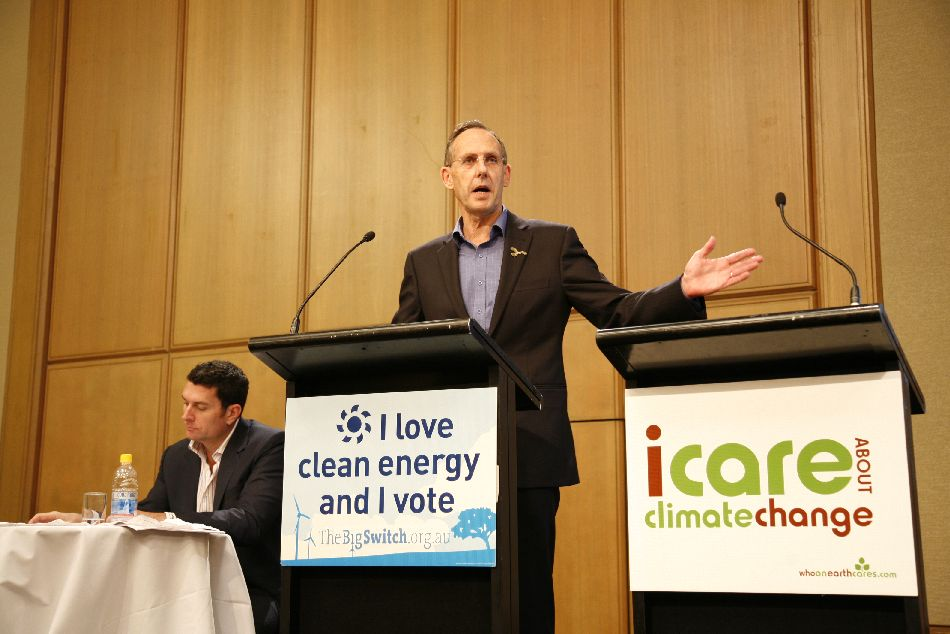
Bob Brown lays out the Greens' climate change policies in the lead-up to the 2007 federal election.

In the 2001 federal election, Brown was re-elected as a senator for Tasmania, and a second Greens senator, Kerry Nettle, was elected in New South Wales. The Greens opposed the Howard government's Pacific Solution of offshore processing for asylum seekers, and opposed the bipartisan offers of support to ANZUS and the Afghanistan War by the government and Beazley Opposition in the aftermath of the September 11 attacks. The party described the Afghanistan commitment in particular as "warmongering". Brown and Nettle's performance in the Senate increased voter support for the party, as it showcased that the Greens were not deep ecologists nor a single-issue environmentalist organisation, thus granting approval from disaffected Labor voters.

On 19 October 2002, the Greens won a House of Representatives seat for the first time when Michael Organ won the Cunningham by-election, triggered by the resignation of Labor member Stephen Martin.

==== 2004 election and 40th parliament ====
In the 2004 federal election, the Australian Greens fielded candidates in every House of Representatives seat in Australia. The Greens' primary vote rose by 2.3% to 7.2%. This won them two additional Senate seats, taken by Christine Milne in Tasmania and Rachel Siewert in Western Australia, bringing the total to four. In New South Wales, the Greens ran John Kaye as their lead Senate candidate but were unsuccessful due to unfavourable preference flows, and Organ lost his seat to Labor's Sharon Bird.

At the 2004 election, the Australian Greens replaced the Australian Democrats as the largest third party in elections, a title that they have held since.

==== 2007 election and 41st parliament ====
The Greens increased their national vote by 1.38 points to 9.04% at the 2007 federal election, with the election of South Australian senator Sarah Hanson-Young taking the number of Greens senators to five. Senators Bob Brown (Tas) and Kerry Nettle (NSW) were up for re-election, Brown was re-elected, but Nettle was unsuccessful, becoming the only Australian Greens senator to lose their seat despite increasing her vote from 2001.

In November 2008, Senator Christine Milne was elected deputy leader in a ballot contested against Senator Rachel Siewert.

In 2009, the Greens and the Liberal Party voted to defeat Labor's emission trading scheme legislation after failed negotiations for an emissions cut target.

==== 2010 election and 43rd parliament ====
The 2010 federal election marked a high point for the Greens electorally, with the party receiving its largest vote to date and sharing the balance of power. The Greens received a four percent swing to finish with 13 percent of the vote in the Senate. The Greens won a seat in each of the six states at the election, bringing the party to a total of nine senators from July 2011, holding the balance of power in the Senate. The new senators were Lee Rhiannon in New South Wales, Richard Di Natale in Victoria, Larissa Waters in Queensland, Rachel Siewert in Western Australia, Penny Wright in South Australia and Christine Milne in Tasmania. Incumbents Scott Ludlam in Western Australia, Sarah Hanson-Young in South Australia and Bob Brown in Tasmania were not due for re-election. The Greens also won their first House of Representatives seat at a general election, the seat of Melbourne with candidate Adam Bandt, who was a crossbencher in the first hung parliament since the 1940 federal election. Almost two weeks after the election, the Greens agreed to support a Gillard Labor minority government on confidence and supply votes. Labor was returned to government with the additional support of three independent crossbenchers.

Prior to the 2010 federal election, the Electrical Trades Union's Victorian branch donated $325,000 to the Greens' Victorian campaign – the largest political donation ever directed to the Party up to that time.

The Greens signed a formal agreement with the Australian Labor Party involving consultation in relation to policy and support in the House of Representatives in relation to confidence and supply and three of the independents declared their support for Labor on confidence and supply, allowing Gillard and Labor to remain in power with a 76–74 minority government.

On 24 February 2011, in a joint press conference of the "Climate Change Committee" – comprising the Government, Greens and two independent MPs – Prime Minister Gillard announced a plan to legislate for the introduction of a fixed price to be imposed on "carbon pollution" from 1 July 2012 The carbon price would be placed for three to five years before a full emissions trading scheme is implemented, under a blueprint agreed by a multi-party parliamentary committee. Key issues remained to be negotiated between the Government and the cross-benches, including compensation arrangements for households and businesses, the carbon price level, the emissions reduction target and whether or not to include fuel in the price.

In April 2012, Bob stepped down as leader of the Australian Greens, and retired from the Senate in June 2012.

=== Christine Milne's leadership (2012–2015) ===
Christine Milne led the Australian Greens through the remainder of the minority parliament, after being elected unopposed.

==== 2013 election and 44th parliament ====
At the 2013 federal election, the House of Representatives (lower house) primary vote was 8.7 percent (−3.1) with the Senate (upper house) primary vote at 8.7 percent (−4.5). Despite receiving a decline in votes, the Greens representation in the parliament increased. Adam Bandt retained his Melbourne seat with a primary vote of 42.6 percent (+7.0) and a two-candidate preferred vote of 55.3 percent (−0.6). The Greens won four Senate positions, increasing their Senate representation from nine to ten senators.

At the 2014 Australian Senate special election in Western Australia, the Greens won in excess of a quota with the primary vote increasing from 9.5 to 15.6 percent, re-electing Scott Ludlam.

In December 2015, the Greens struck a deal with the Coalition government, passing a law requiring multinational private companies with a turnover over $200 million to disclose their tax arrangements. This law also made it mandatory for multinational companies with a global turnover of $1 billion or more to have to prepare "general purpose" financial statements, which disclose greater tax details than previously occurred in Australia. The following year the Coalition government and the Greens agreed on a permanent 15% tax rate for backpackers, in exchange for a $100 million funding boost to environmental stewardship not-for-profit Landcare.

Christine Milne stepped down from the leadership of the Australian Greens on 6 May 2015.

=== Richard Di Natale's leadership (2015–2020) ===
Di Natale was elected unopposed as parliamentary leader of the Greens party room on 6 May 2015 following the resignation of Christine Milne from the position.

==== 2016 election and 45th parliament ====
At the 2016 federal election, the House of Representatives (lower house) primary vote increased to 10.23 percent (+1.58) but decreased in the Senate (upper house), with primary vote at 8.65 percent (−0.58). Adam Bandt was elected to a third term in his Melbourne seat with a primary vote of 43.75 percent (+1.13) and a two-candidate preferred vote of 68.48 percent (+13.21). Despite a campaign focus on winning additional seats in the lower house, The Greens failed to win any lower house contests.

The Greens also lost one Senate position in South Australia, decreasing their Senate representation from ten to nine senators, to a total of ten Green members in the Parliament of Australia. The result was seen as disappointing, and caused internal divisions to flare up, with former Federal Leader Bob Brown calling upon Senator Lee Rhiannon to resign, citing the "need for renewal".

In 2017, Greens Senators Scott Ludlam and Larissa Waters were forced to resign during 2017–18 Australian parliamentary eligibility crisis after it was found that Ludlam had dual Australian–New Zealand citizenship and Waters had dual citizenship with Canada. Subsequently, Adam Bandt and Rachel Siewert were named as temporary co-deputy leaders until the arrival of Ludlam and Waters' replacements in Canberra.

==== 2019 election and 46th parliament ====
At the 2019 federal election, the Australian Greens received a primary vote of 10.4% in the House of Representatives, with a federal swing of +0.2%. The party's highest vote was captured in the Australian Capital Territory (16.8%), followed by Victoria (11.9%), Western Australia (11.6%), Queensland (10.3%), Northern Territory (10.2%), Tasmania (10.1%), South Australia (9.6%) and New South Wales (8.7%). The party retained the federal electorate of Melbourne with Adam Bandt sitting at a 71.8% two-party preferred vote. All six Greens senators up for re-election retained their seats, including Senators Mehreen Faruqi, Janet Rice, Larissa Waters, Sarah Hanson-Young, Jordon Steele-John and Nick McKim.

Three key seats were targeted by the Greens in Victoria, including Kooyong, Higgins and Macnamara. Prominent barrister Julian Burnside, who stood for Kooyong, came close to unseating treasurer and deputy Liberal leader Josh Frydenberg, falling short by 5.7% in the two-party preferred vote. Greens candidate Jason Ball, for the Division of Higgins, failed to enter the two-party preferred vote, despite optimism within the Greens and a diminishing Liberal vote. In Macnamara (formerly Melbourne Ports), a three-way contest emerged between the Liberals, Labor and Greens. Greens candidate Steph Hodgins-May had come within a few hundred votes in 2016 of taking the seat, however, redistributions in the electorate for the 2019 election were unfavourable for the Greens' vote, and the party's final vote sat at 24.2%.

On 3 February 2020, Di Natale resigned as leader of the Greens and announced his intention to resign from the Senate.

=== Adam Bandt's leadership (2020–2025) ===
On 4 February, Adam Bandt was elected unopposed as parliamentary leader of the Australia Greens party room.

==== 2022 election and 47th parliament ====
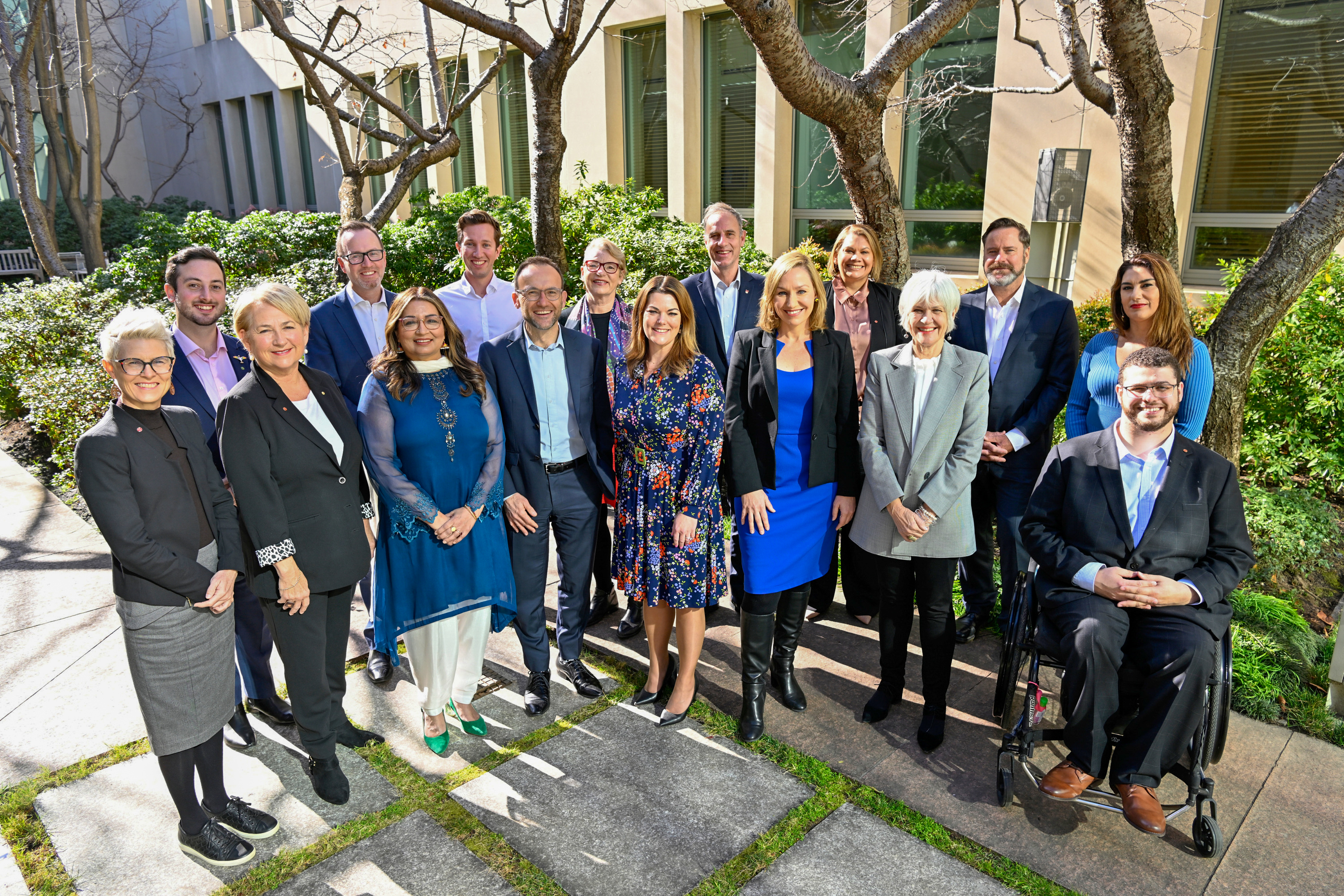
All Greens members in federal parliament following the 2022 election.

The Greens' strategy for the 2022 federal election involved targeting nine key seats, including the previously Labor-held seats of Macnamara, Griffith, Richmond, Wills, and Canberra, and four previously Liberal-held seats of Kooyong, Brisbane, Ryan and Higgins. Bandt claimed that polling suggested a hung parliament was a likely outcome and the Greens would work with Labor to "kick the Liberals out and make the next government go further and faster on climate action, and make billionaires and mining corporations pay their fair share." Antony Green suggested that a redistribution in Victoria by the Australian Electoral Commission would likely increase the Greens' odds of winning the seat of Macnamara.

The party had its best ever result at the election, picking up three seats in inner Brisbane, Elizabeth Watson-Brown in the seat of Ryan, Stephen Bates in the seat of Brisbane, and Max Chandler-Mather in the seat of Griffith, to boost their representation in the House to four MPs, and won a Senate seat in every state to increase to 12 senators with new Senators Barbara Pocock, David Shoebridge and Penny Allman-Payne. This gave them the balance of power. Analysis of vote trends suggested the party succeeded in picking up former votes of both Labor and the Liberal Party. The party were unsuccessful in picking up the seat of Richmond with their high-profile candidate Mandy Nolan.

On 6 February 2023, Victorian Greens senator Lidia Thorpe announced that she would resign from the Greens to become an independent senator, over disagreements concerning the proposed Indigenous Voice to Parliament.

In mid-March 2024, the Greens announced they would introduce legislation seeking to break the dominance of the two supermarket giants Woolworths Group and Coles Group by forcing them to sell some of their operations. While the Albanese government did not support the bill, it found support from the centre-right National Party.

==== 2025 election and 48th parliament ====
The Greens lost party leader Adam Bandt in the seat of Melbourne, Stephen Bates in the seat of Brisbane, and Max Chandler-Mather in the seat of Griffith in the 2025 federal election, with Labor taking all three seats in a landslide victory. When Bandt conceded on 8 May 2025 Tasmanian Greens senator Nick McKim as party whip became acting leader until the planned leadership meeting.

=== Larissa Waters' leadership (2025–2026) ===
Queensland Senator Larissa Waters was elected unopposed as party leader on 15 May 2025, with Mehreen Faruqi continuing as deputy leader. Sarah Hanson-Young was expected to run for the party leadership, however was elected as Manager of Greens Business.

On 6 June 2025, Senator for Western Australia Dorinda Cox defected to Labor.

Waters announced her resignation from the party's leadership as the result of a kidney disease. She will also take medical leave from the Senate.

=== David Shoebridge's leadership (2026–present) ===
David Shoebridge became leader of the Australian Greens on 1 October 2026, defeating contenders Mehreen Faruqi and Sarah Hanson-Young in a party room ballot. Steph Hodgins-May won the deputy leadership in a three-way contest against Vanessa Bleyer and Jordon Steele-John.

== Ideology ==
The Australian Greens are part of the global "green politics" movement. Former party Leader Adam Bandt describes The Greens as a social democratic party. The charter of the Australian Greens identifies four main pillars as the party's policy: "social justice", "sustainability", "grassroots democracy" and "peace and non-violence".

=== Policy positions ===
==== Environment and climate change ====
The party favours environmentalism, including expansion of recycling facilities; phasing out single-use plastics; conservation efforts; and addressing species extinction, habitat loss and deforestation in Australia.

The Greens support the achieving of 100% renewable energy by 2030 through the establishment of a Green New Deal, which entails investment in renewable energy technology and a revitalisation of Australian manufacturing. Manufacturing would be required to produce solar panels, wind turbines and green steel produced from hydrogen. The party supports the creation of a publicly owned renewable energy provider to boost renewable energy and lower household electricity prices. To support the transition to clean energy, the party calls for growth in lithium mining. The Greens have also proposed plans to boost jobs and apprenticeships in the construction of public housing units as further economic stimulus as well as to address rising homelessness in Australia.

==== Finance ====
The Greens oppose tax cuts that solely benefit the top bracket of income earners and lead to economic inequality. The Greens believe that all essential services need to be adequately funded to suit community needs; and argue for the re-establishment of a publicly owned bank. The party argues for a Corporate Super-Profits Tax on major corporations, the establishment of a wealth tax on billionaires, and an end to multi-national corporation's tax avoidance. In 2026, party leader David Shoebridge introduced a new policy to cut taxes for workers by raising the tax free threshold from $18,200 to $26,000, resulting in a tax cut of over $1000 per year for almost every working Australian.

In 2024, Green Economic Justice Spokesperson Nick McKim argued in favour of the Treasurer pressuring the independent Reserve Bank of Australia into lowering the cash rate, with the party website stating that part of its plan to modernise the RBA would be "ending the pretence that the RBA is independent and ‘above politics’."

The party advocates for significant changes to welfare policies. They propose solving housing shortages and homelessness through the creation of affordable social housing. The party also wants to introduce rent caps to limit growth of rental prices. Greens also propose increase in all income support payments to $88 a day, that would make them $1,232 per fortnight. The Greens also advocate for free childcare as well as free public transport. Finally, the Greens propose to increase the minimum wage.

Green politicians have campaigned on free university and technical and further education. The party opposes fee hikes for degrees and funding cuts for universities, and have called for increased funding for public schools. The party also supports the abolition of all student debt.

==== Health ====
The party supports universal health care through extending Medicare coverage into dental health care and mental health care. Furthermore, the party supports reproductive health rights and voluntary euthanasia. The Greens support drug law reform, including the legalisation of cannabis; treating drug use as a health issue rather than a criminal issue; and the provision of free drug checking stations at community events and relevant venues. Further information on the Greens cannabis legalisation proposed law can be found at Legalising Cannabis Bill 2023.

==== Social issues ====
The Greens have advocated on for various social issues, such as the legalisation of marriage equality, the right to seek asylum, and gender equality. The Greens also advocate for policies that they believe will strengthen Australian democracy and "clean up politics", including capping political donations and strengthening the powers of the National Anti-Corruption Commission.

==== Agriculture ====
In terms of agricultural policy, the party strongly favours policies to promote animal welfare and climate resilience with farmers. The Greens strongly support reducing soil and water degradation through community-driven decision-making processes, and supporting farmers experiencing effects of climate change.

==== Animal welfare ====
The Greens are in favour of phasing out live animal exports, instead favouring investment in the domestic chilled meat industry. The Greens have also campaigned on banning greyhound racing, whaling and animal-tested cosmetics. The party believes in phasing out caged egg production and sow stalls, instead favouring ethical farming practices. The party advocates for the reduction of methane emissions from livestock through research, animal health and nutrition, selection and genetics.

==== Foreign affairs ====
On foreign policy, the party says that it wants "Independent, transparent and accountable foreign and defence policies based on mutual respect."

In August 2025, the Greens urged the Albanese government to impose direct sanctions on high-ranking members of Netanyahu's government and to stop supplying parts for F-35 fighter jets to the global supply chain that can be accessed by Israel. Greens senator David Shoebridge said: "If the Albanese government stopped the export of F-35 fighter jet parts to Israel, then their F-35 fleet would be grounded."

The Greens oppose the Russian invasion of Ukraine, but stand in opposition to Ukrainian military aid without a UN Security Council resolution supporting it, instead stating that they support providing them "basic humanitarian and civil assistance", with the party being against the global transfer of weapons in principle. This position was criticised by multiple Australian politicians as well as Ukrainian Ambassador to Australia Vasyl Myroshnychenko who stated “I cannot believe, then, that the Greens actively seek an outcome where President Putin’s policies are imposed on Ukrainian society, we lose the social freedoms and equalities Australians enjoy, and our entire nation is swallowed up by Russia.”

==== Voting system ====
The party supports proportional representation in the House of Representatives and local government.

== Structure ==
=== Parliament ===
==== Federal leaders ====
On Saturday 12 November 2005 at the national conference in Hobart, the Australian Greens abandoned their long-standing tradition of having no official leader and approved a process whereby a parliamentary leader could be elected by the Greens Parliamentary Party Room. On Monday 28 November 2005, Bob Brown – who had long been regarded as de facto leader by many inside the party, and most people outside the party – was elected unopposed as the Parliamentary Party Leader. Each leader has been described to represent a faction within the party, with the political journalist Paddy Manning describing that Christine Milne came from the right wing of the party, while Bandt is the first Greens leader from the left wing of the party.

The leadership is decided by consensus within the party room (or a party room vote if consensus cannot be reached), and all previous Greens leaders have been elected unopposed (as of 2025).

In May 2020, 62% of rank-and-file Greens party members voted for democratically Leadership election to pick the leader, However it failed to meet the two-thirds majority of 66.67% which is required to force a change.

==== Parliamentary portfolios ====
Greens MPs are each assigned their own portfolios, or specific areas of responsibility. All portfolios are decided by the party and may differ in title from the government's portfolio priorities The Greens have formed a Gun Control portfolio, of which there is no equivalent in the government.

Portfolios are divided into five major categories according to the Greens: "an equal society", "world-class essential services", "climate and the environment", "the green economy", and "a confident Australia".

=== National Council ===
The Australian Greens is federally organised with separately registered state parties signing up to a national constitution, yet retaining considerable policy-making and organisational autonomy from the centre. The national decision-making body of the Australian Greens is the National Council, consisting of delegates from each member body (a state or territory Greens party), two members of the federal party room, a representative of the Australian Greens First Nations Network (AGFNN, or Blak Greens), and the national office bearers including the National Convenor, Secretary and Treasurer. As at May 2020, all seven of the party's office bearer positions are held by women. There is also a Public Officer, a Party Agent and a Registered Officer. The National Council arrives at decisions by consensus. All policies originating from this structure are subject to ratification by the members of the Australian Greens at National Conference.

=== State and territory parties ===
The Australian Greens are a federation consisting of eight parties from each state and territory. The various Australian states and territories have different electoral systems, all of which allow the Greens to gain representation. As of 2024, the Greens hold at least one seat in all eight state and territory legislatures.

Five Greens have become ministers at the state/territory level: Nick McKim and Cassy O'Connor in Tasmania, 2010–2014; and in the ACT, Shane Rattenbury from 2012 and Emma Davidson and Rebecca Vassarotti from 2020 to 2024.

Most of the state-based Green parties which have joined the Australian Greens do not have a formal leader, and instead they have a shared leadership structure. However, Tasmania, Victoria, Western Australia, and the ACT have adopted singular leadership structures into their party.

The current Australian Green member parties are the following:

Party	Leader	Last state/territory election & current seat tally					Status	Federal representatives	
Party	Leader	Lower House			Upper House		Status	MPs	Senators
Party	Leader	Year	Votes (%)	Current seats	Votes (%)	Current seats	Status	MPs	Senators
New South Wales Greens	None	2023	9.7	3 / 93	9.1	4 / 42	Crossbench	0 / 46	2 / 12
Victorian Greens	Ellen Sandell	2022	11.5	3 / 88	10.3	4 / 40	Crossbench	0 / 38	1 / 12
Queensland Greens	None	2024	9.9	1 / 93	—N/a (Note: Queensland has maintained a unicameral legislature since 1922.)		Crossbench	1 / 30	2 / 12
Western Australian Greens	Brad Pettitt	2025	11.1	0 / 59	10.9	4 / 37	Crossbench	0 / 16	1 / 12
South Australian Greens	None	2022	9.1	0 / 47	9.0	1 / 22	Crossbench	0 / 10	2 / 12
Tasmanian Greens	Rosalie Woodruff	2024	13.9	5 / 35	—N/a (Note: Tasmania elects legislative council representatives on a periodic basis, with elections held almost every year.)	1 / 15	Crossbench	0 / 5	2 / 12
ACT Greens	Jo Clay	2024	12.2	4 / 25	—N/a (Note: The ACT has a unicameral parliament.)		Crossbench	0 / 3	0 / 2
NT Greens	None	2024	8.1	0 / 25	—N/a (Note: The Northern Territory has a unicameral parliament.)		Crossbench	0 / 2	0 / 2

==== Working groups ====
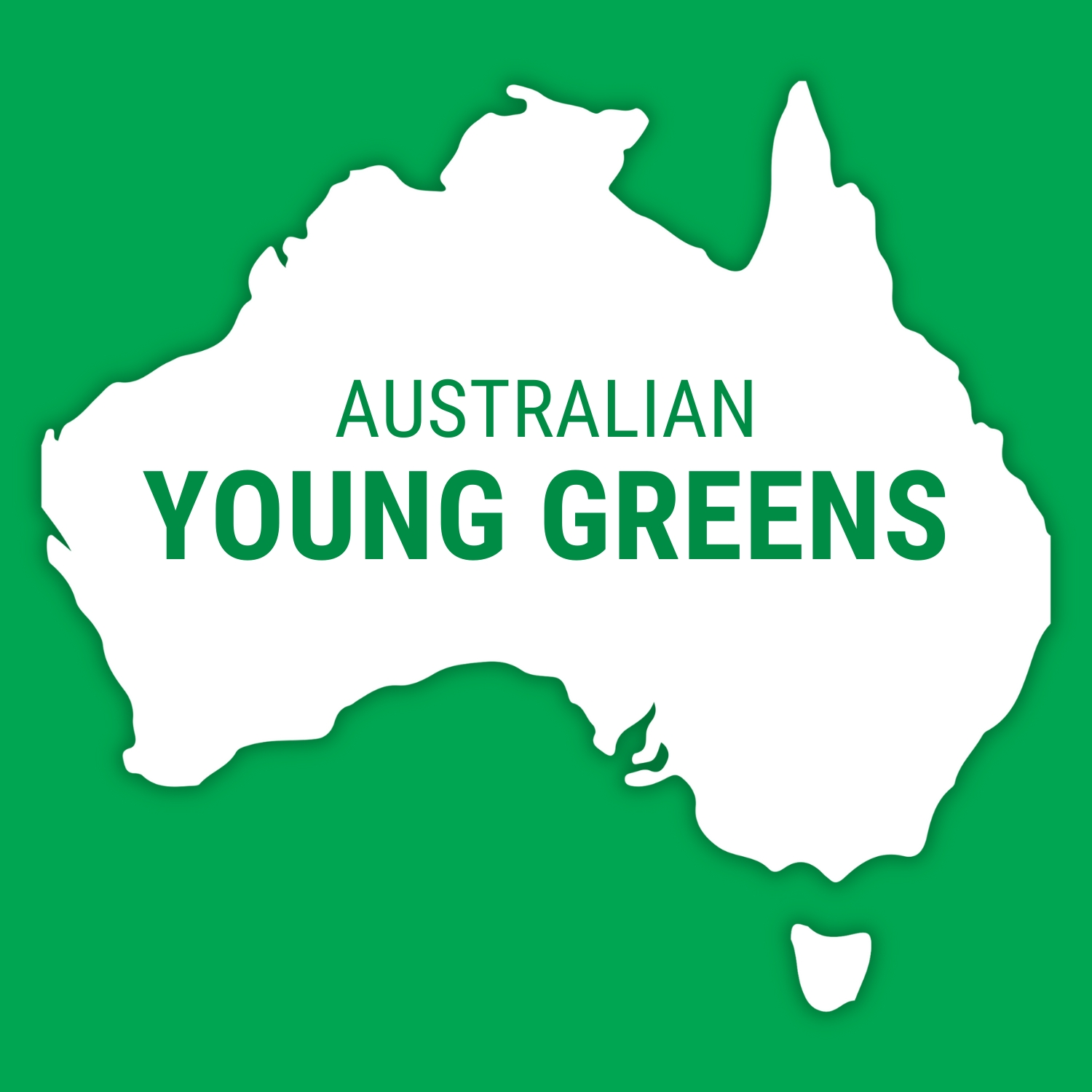
Australian Young Greens logo.

A variety of working groups have been established by the National Council, which are directly accessible to all Greens members. Working groups perform an advisory function by developing policy, reviewing or developing the party structure, or by performing other tasks assigned by the National Council.

The Australian Young Greens are a federation of Young Greens groups from each Australian state and territory. Together they form the youth wing of the Australian Greens

A national Sexuality and Gender Identity Working Group exists at a federal level, and there are LGBTIQ working groups in some state and territory parties, including: Queer Greens Victoria, Queensland Rainbow Greens, SA Greens Queer Members Action Group, NSW Greens Sex, Sexuality and Gender Identity Working Group.

== Support ==
The Greens generally draw support from younger voters with higher than average educational attainment. The Greens absorbed much of the Australian Democrats' support base following its downfall as the third party in Australia and many of the social and environmental policies and issues that the Democrats advocated for have been taken up by the Greens. Much like the Democrats, the Greens have a higher proportion of supporters who are university educated, under 40, identify as professionals in their field, are small business owners, and earn above the national average wage. Notably, there has also been a steady increase in working-class support for the Greens since the creation of the party.

In 2019, Ian McAllister in an analysis of class voting patterns found that Greens voters are distinguished as being high in cultural capital, such as a university education, but tend to be in asset poverty due to not owning their own home. Political scientist Todd Farrell in an analysis in 2020 found that, unlike other minor parties in the past (such as the Australian Democrats), Greens supporters hold high levels of party identification and consistent durable vote, indicating a political realignment in Australian politics away from the major Labor and Liberal parties.

== Electoral performance ==
=== House of Representatives ===
Election	Leader	Votes	%	Seats	+/–	Position	Status
1993	None	196,702	1.83	0 / 147	Steady	▲5th	No seats
1996	None	188,994	1.74	0 / 148	Steady	▼6th	No seats
1998	None	238,035	2.14	0 / 148	Steady	6th	No seats
2001	None	569,074	4.96	0 / 150	Steady	▲5th	No seats
2004	None	841,734	7.19	0 / 150	Steady	▲3rd	No seats
2007	Bob Brown	967,789	7.79	0 / 150	Steady	3rd	No seats
2010	Bob Brown	1,458,998	11.76	1 / 150	▲1	3rd	Confidence and supply
2013	Christine Milne	1,116,918	8.65	1 / 150	Steady	3rd	Crossbench
2016	Richard Di Natale	1,385,651	10.23	1 / 150	Steady	3rd	Crossbench
2019	Richard Di Natale	1,482,923	10.40	1 / 151	Steady	3rd	Crossbench
2022	Adam Bandt	1,795,985	12.25	4 / 151	▲3	3rd	Crossbench
2025	Adam Bandt	1,889,977	12.20	1 / 150	▼3	3rd	Crossbench

=== Senate ===
Election	Leader	Votes	%	Seats		+/–	Position	Status
Election	Leader	Votes	%	Up	Total	+/–	Position	Status
1990	None	201,618	2.0	0 / 40	0 / 76	Steady	▲5th	No seats
1993	None	263,106	2.5	0 / 40	0 / 76	Steady	5th	No seats
1996	None	180,404	1.7	0 / 40	0 / 76	Steady	5th	No seats
1998	None	244,165	2.2	0 / 40	1 / 76	(Note: Bob Brown was elected to the senate in 1996 as a representative of the Tasmanian Greens. By the time of the 1998 election (where he was not up for re-election), the Tasmanian Greens had affiliated with the national organisation.)	5th	Crossbench
2001	None	574,543	4.9	2 / 40	2 / 76	▲1	▲4th	Crossbench
2004	None	916,431	7.7	2 / 40	4 / 76	▲2	4th	Crossbench
2007	Bob Brown	1,144,751	9.0	3 / 40	5 / 76	▲1	▲3rd	Crossbench
2010	Bob Brown	1,667,315	13.1	6 / 40	9 / 76	▲4	3rd	Crossbench
2013	Christine Milne	1,159,588	8.6	4 / 40	10 / 76	▲1	3rd	Crossbench
2016	Richard Di Natale	1,197,657	8.7	9 / 76	9 / 76	▼1	3rd	Crossbench
2019	Richard Di Natale	1,488,427	10.2	6 / 40	9 / 76	Steady	3rd	Crossbench
2022	Adam Bandt	1,903,403	12.6	6 / 40	12 / 76	▲3	3rd	Crossbench
2025	Adam Bandt	1,859,974	11.72	6 / 40	11 / 76	(Note: Lidia Thorpe was elected to the senate in 2022 as a representative of the Greens. She left the party in 2023 to sit as an independent.)	3rd	Crossbench

=== Results timeline ===
Year	(Australia) AU	(Australian Capital Territory) ACT	(New South Wales) NSW	(Northern Territory) NT	(Queensland) Qld	(South Australia) SA	(Tasmania) Tas	(Victoria (state)) Vic	(Western Australia) WA
1989	N/A	N/A	N/A	N/A	N/A	N/A	N/A	N/A	0.5
1990	N/A	N/A	N/A	3.0	N/A	N/A	N/A	N/A	0.5
1991	N/A	N/A	0.5	3.0	N/A	N/A	N/A	N/A	0.5
1992	N/A	N/A	0.5	3.0	N/A	N/A	13.2	N/A	0.5
1993	1.8	N/A	0.5	3.0	N/A	N/A	13.2	N/A	▲4.3
1994	1.8	N/A	0.5	▼0.8	N/A	N/A	13.2	N/A	▲4.3
1995	1.8	9.1	▲2.6	▼0.8	2.9	N/A	13.2	N/A	▲4.3
1996	▼1.7	9.1	▲2.6	▼0.8	2.9	N/A	▼11.1	N/A	▲4.7
1997	▼1.7	9.1	▲2.6	▼0.6	2.9	0.2	▼11.1	N/A	▲4.7
1998	▲2.1	▲9.1	▲2.6	▼0.6	▼2.4	0.2	▼10.2	N/A	▲4.7
1999	▲2.1	▲9.1	▲3.9	▼0.6	▼2.4	0.2	▼10.2	1.2	▲4.7
2000	▲2.1	▲9.1	▲3.9	▼0.6	▼2.4	0.2	▼10.2	1.2	▲4.7
2001	▲5.0	▼9.1	▲3.9	N/A	▲2.5	0.2	▼10.2	1.2	▲7.3
2002	▲5.0	▼9.1	▲3.9	N/A	▲2.5	▲2.4	▲18.1	▲9.7	▲7.3
2003	▲5.0	▼9.1	▲8.3	N/A	▲2.5	▲2.4	▲18.1	▲9.7	▲7.3
2004	▲7.2	▲9.3	▲8.3	N/A	▲6.8	▲2.4	▲18.1	▲9.7	▲7.3
2005	▲7.2	▲9.3	▲8.3	▲4.2	▲6.8	▲2.4	▲18.1	▲9.7	▲7.8
2006	▲7.2	▲9.3	▲8.3	▲4.2	▲8.0	▲6.5	▼16.6	▲10.0	▲7.8
2007	▲7.8	▲9.3	▲8.9	▲4.2	▲8.0	▲6.5	▼16.6	▲10.0	▲7.8
2008	▲7.8	▲15.6	▲8.9	▲4.3	▲8.0	▲6.5	▼16.6	▲10.0	▲11.9
2009	▲7.8	▲15.6	▲8.9	▲4.3	▲8.4	▲6.5	▼16.6	▲10.0	▲11.9
2010	▲11.8	▲15.6	▲8.9	▲4.3	▲8.4	▲8.1	▲21.6	▲11.2	▲11.9
2011	▲11.8	▲15.6	▲10.3	▲4.3	▲8.4	▲8.1		▲11.2	▲11.9
2012	▲11.8	▼10.7	▲10.3	▼3.3	▼7.5	▲8.1		▲11.2	▲11.9
2013	▼8.5		▲10.3	▼3.3	▼7.5	▲8.1		▲11.2	▼8.4
2014	▼8.5		▲10.3	▼3.3	▼7.5	▲8.7	▼13.8	▲11.5	▼8.4
2015	▼8.5		▲10.3	▼3.3	▲8.4	▲8.7	▼13.8	▲11.5	▼8.4
2016	▲10.2	▼10.3	▲10.3	▼2.9	▲8.4	▲8.7	▼13.8	▲11.5	▼8.4
2017	▲10.2		▲10.3	▼2.9	▲10.0	▲8.7	▼13.8	▲11.5	▲8.9
2018	▲10.2		▲10.3	▼2.9	▲10.0	▼6.7	▼10.3	▼10.7	▲8.9
2019	▲10.4		▼9.6	▼2.9	▲10.0	▼6.7	▼10.3	▼10.7	▲8.9
2020	▲10.4	▲13.5	▼9.6	▲4.5	▼9.5	▼6.7	▼10.3	▼10.7	▲8.9
2021	▲10.4		▼9.6	▲4.5	▼9.5	▼6.7	▲12.4	▼10.7	▼6.9
2022	▲12.3		▼9.6	▲4.5	▼9.5	▲9.1	▲12.4	▲11.5	▼6.9
2023	▲12.3		▲9.7	▲4.5	▼9.5	▲9.1	▲12.4	▲11.5	▼6.9
2024	▲12.3	▼12.3	▲9.7	▲8.1	▲9.9	▲9.1	▲13.9	▲11.5	▼6.9
2025	▼12.2	▼12.3	▲9.7	▲8.1	▲9.9	▲9.1	▲14.4	▲11.5	▲11.1
2026	▼12.2	▼12.3	▲9.7	▲8.1	▲9.9	▲10.4	▲14.4	—N/a (Note: The 2026 Victorian state election will be held on 28 November 2026)	▲11.1
Year	(Australia) AU	(Australian Capital Territory) ACT	(New South Wales) NSW	(Northern Territory) NT	(Queensland) Qld	(South Australia) SA	(Tasmania) Tas	(Victoria (state)) Vic	(Western Australia) WA
**Bold** indicates best result to date. Present in legislature (in crossbench or opposition); Junior coalition partner Senior coalition partner

== Current federal parliamentarians ==
=== House of Representatives ===
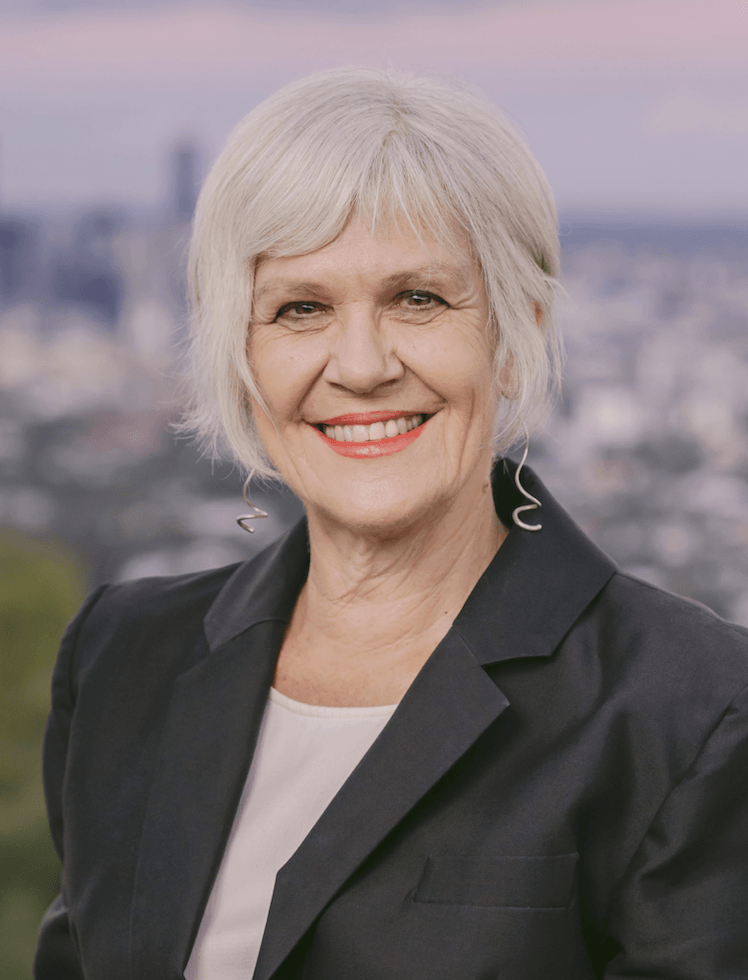
Elizabeth Watson-Brown MP (Ryan, Qld), 2022–present

=== Senate ===
Senator Sarah Hanson-Young (SA), 2008–present

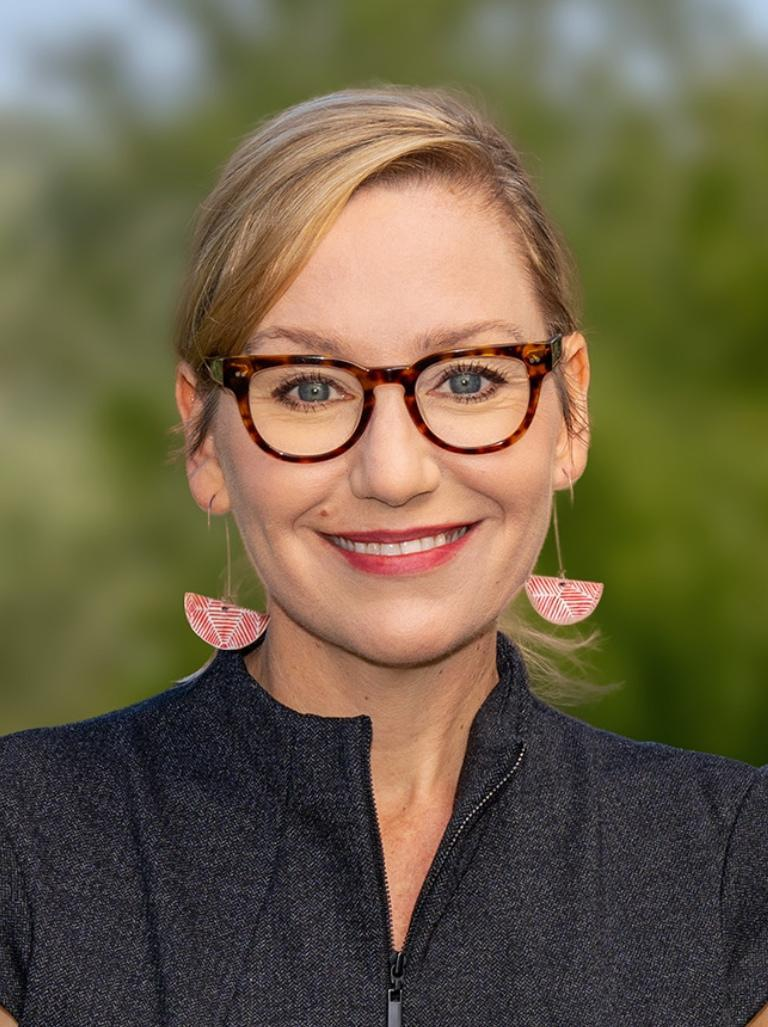
Senator Larissa Waters (Qld), 2011–2017, 2018–present

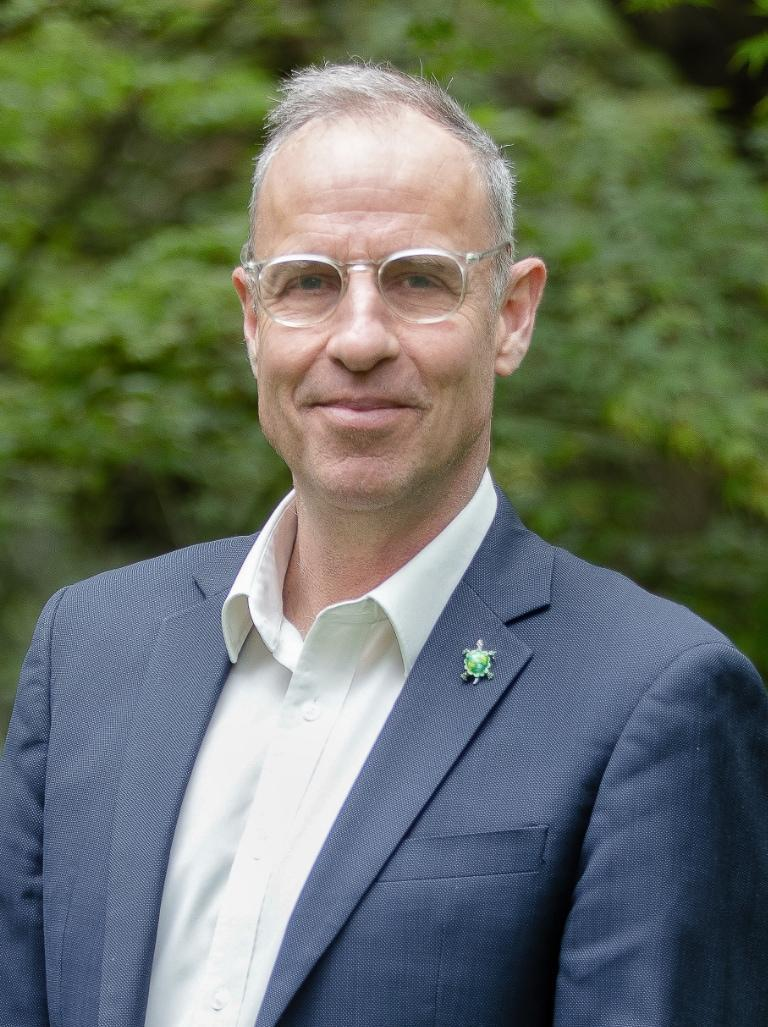
Senator Nick McKim (Tas), 2015–present

Senator Jordon Steele-John (WA), 2017–present

Senator Mehreen Faruqi (NSW), 2018–present

Senator David Shoebridge (NSW), 2022–present

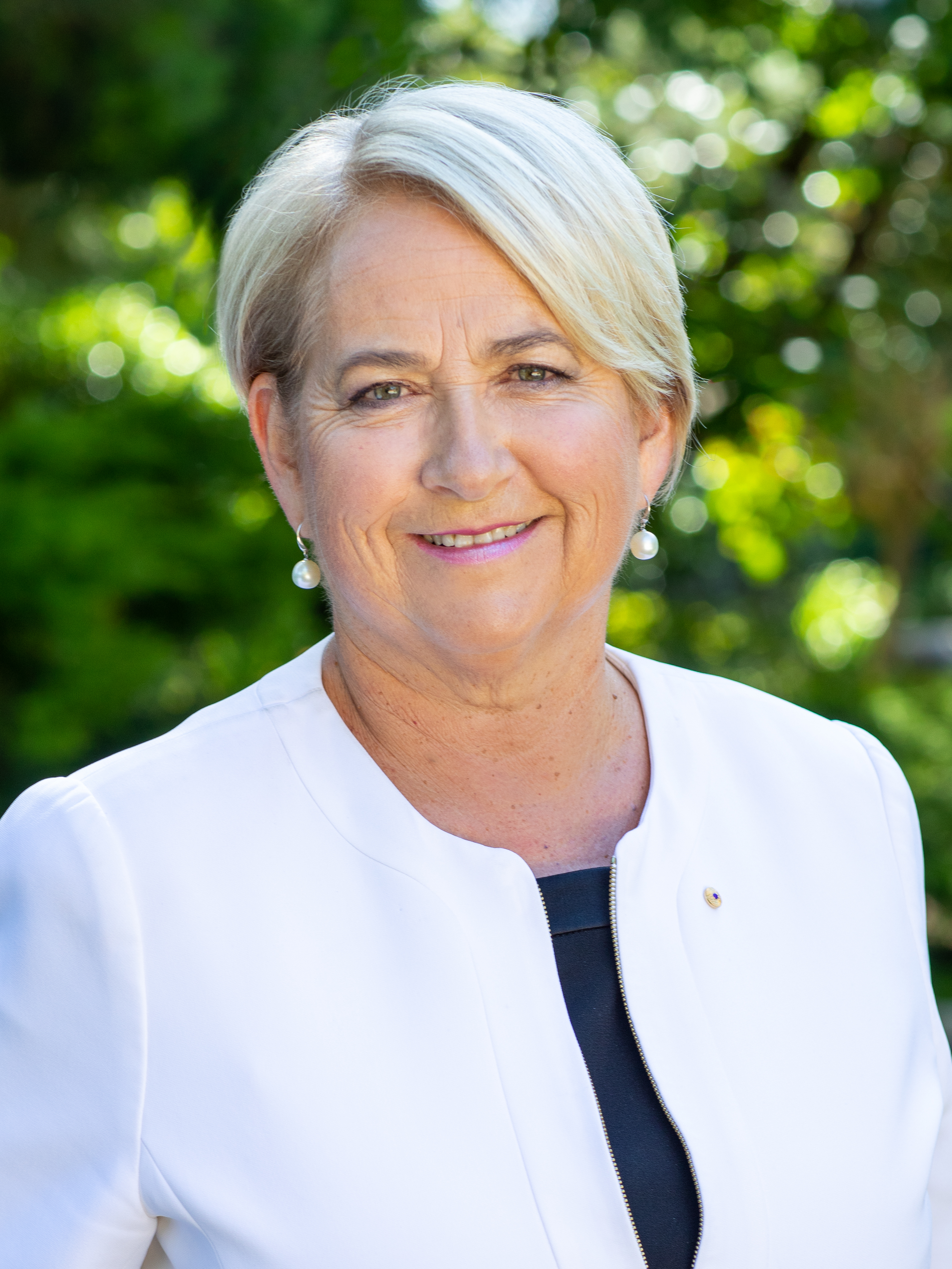
Senator Barbara Pocock (SA), 2022–present

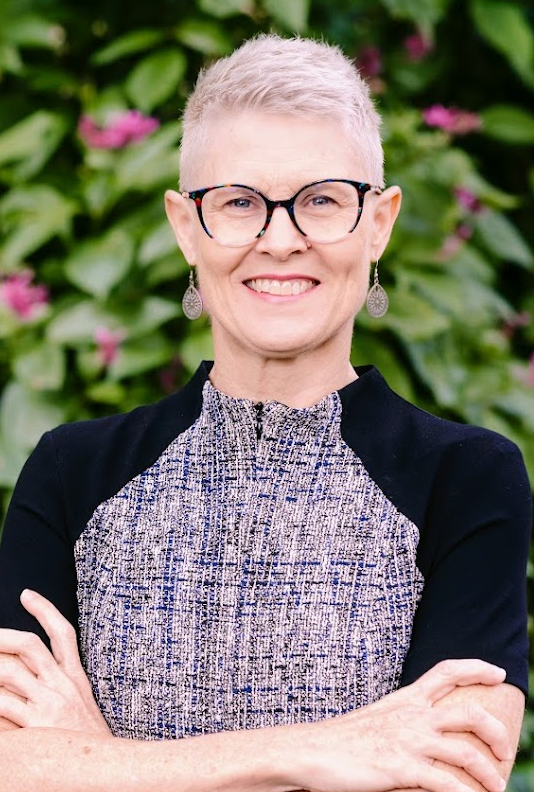
Senator Penny Allman-Payne (Qld), 2022–present

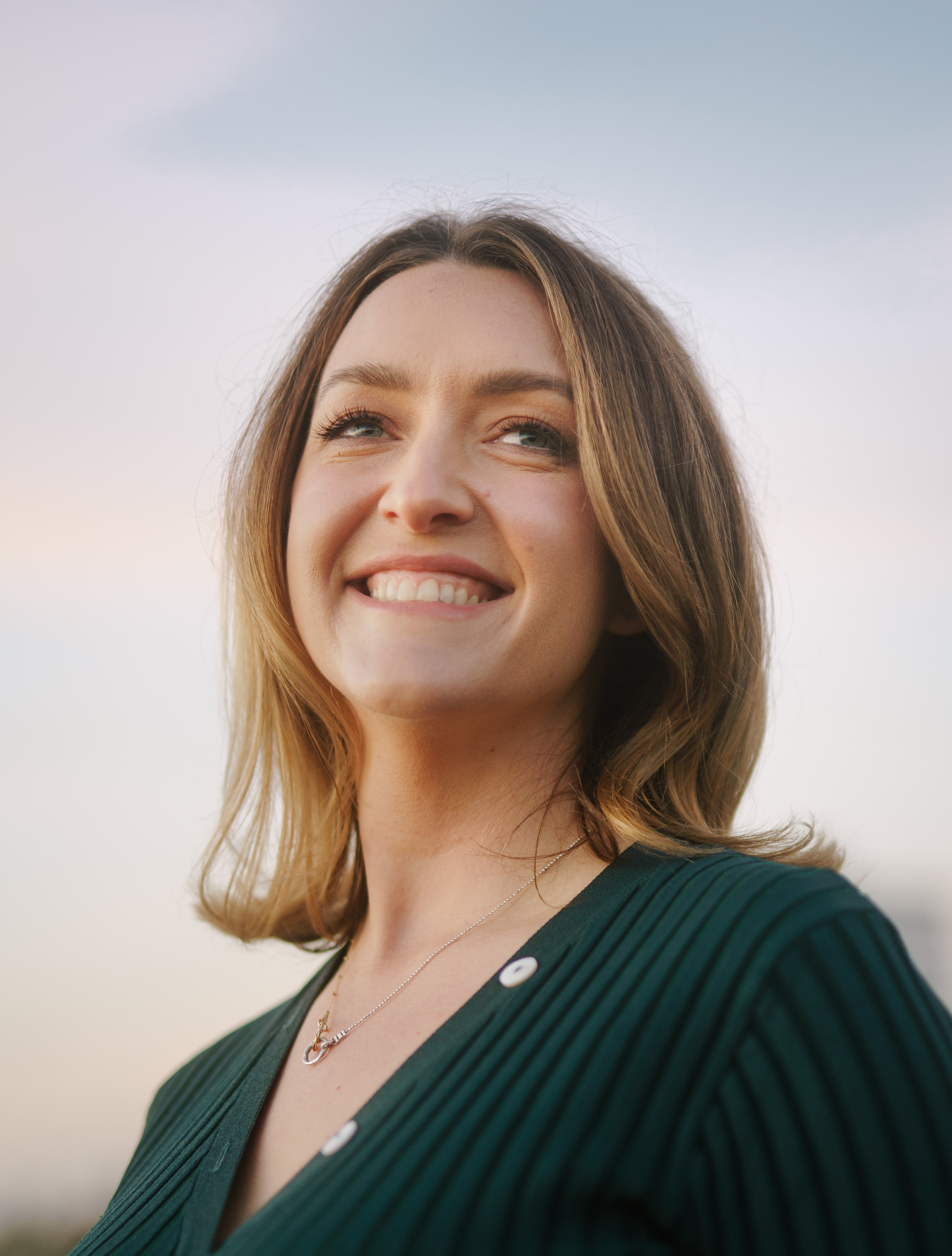
Senator Steph Hodgins-May (Vic), 2024–present

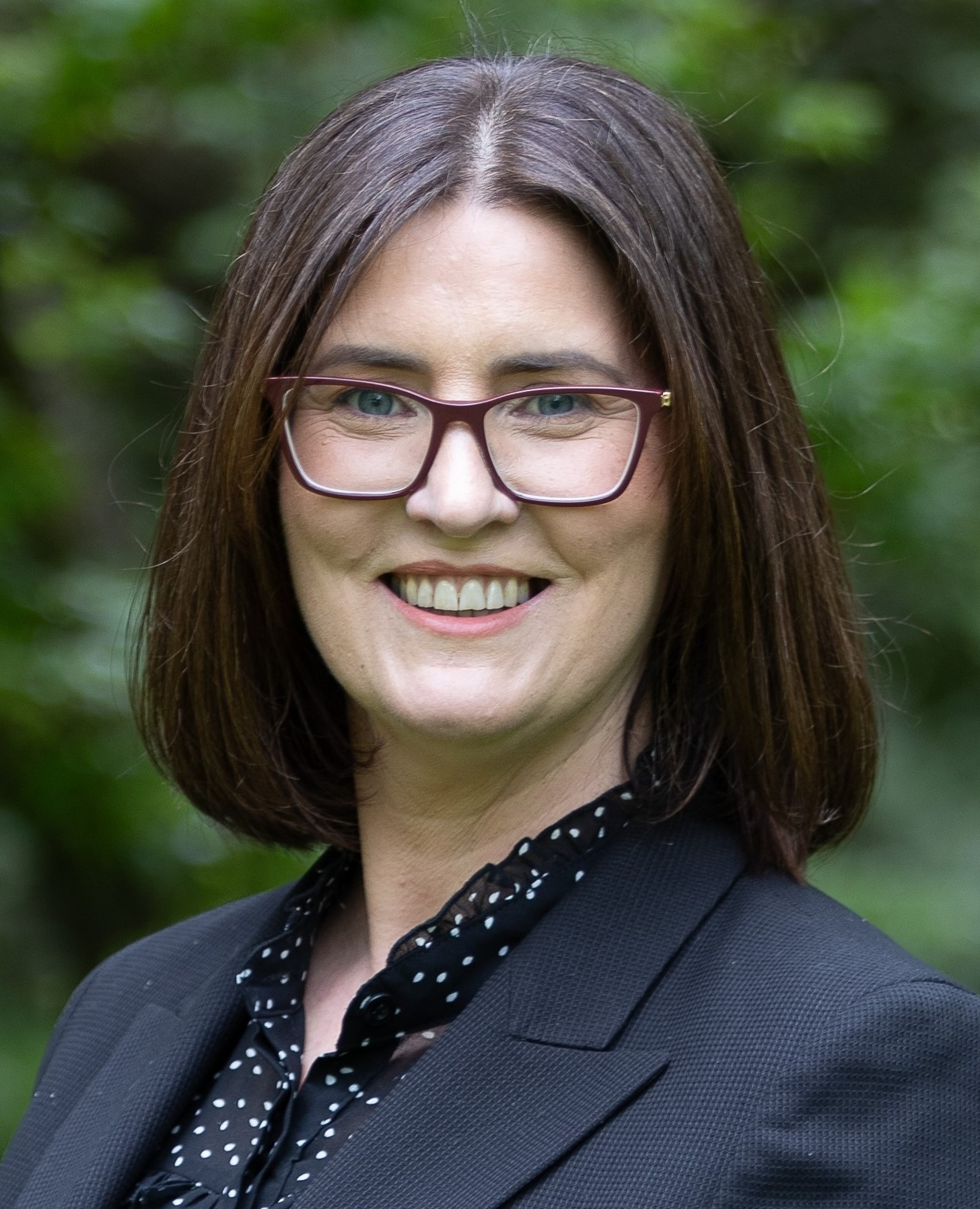
Senator Vanessa Bleyer (Tas), 2026–present

=== Former ===
- Senator Jo Vallentine, 1990–1992, Greens WA (Note: originally elected in 1984 for the Nuclear Disarmament Party)
- Senator Christabel Chamarette, 1992–1996, Greens WA
- Senator Dee Margetts, 1993–1999, Greens WA
- Senator Bob Brown (Tas), 1996–2012
- Michael Organ MP (Cunningham, NSW), 2002–2004
- Senator Kerry Nettle (NSW), 2002–2008
- Senator Christine Milne (Tas), 2005–2015
- Senator Rachel Siewert (WA), 2005–2021
- Senator Scott Ludlam (WA), 2008–2017
- Senator Richard Di Natale (Vic), 2011–2020
- Senator Lee Rhiannon (NSW), 2011–2018
- Senator Penny Wright (SA), 2011–2015
- Senator Janet Rice (Vic), 2014–2024
- Senator Robert Simms (SA), 2015–2016
- Senator Andrew Bartlett (Qld), 2017–2018
- Senator Lidia Thorpe (Vic), 2020–2023 (Note: Left party)
- Max Chandler-Mather MP (Griffith, QLD), 2022–2025
- Stephen Bates MP (Brisbane, QLD), 2022–2025
- Adam Bandt MP (Melbourne, VIC) 2010–2025
- Senator Dorinda Cox (WA), 2021–2025 (Note: defected to Labor)
- Senator Peter Whish-Wilson (Tas), 2012–2026

Senators Vallentine, Chamarette and Margetts were all elected as Greens (WA) senators and served their terms before the Greens WA affiliated to the Australian Greens, meaning that they were not considered to be Australian Greens senators at the time.

For current and former state parliamentarians, see the List of Australian Greens parliamentarians.

== Other notable members ==
- Clive Hamilton, Greens candidate for the 2009 Higgins by-election
- Chris Harris, former Greens Councillor for the City of Sydney
- Jean Jenkins, former Democrats Senator for Western Australia
- Jack Mundey, trade union leader involved in the green bans
- Janet Powell, former Democrats leader
- Peter Singer, moral philosopher and Greens candidate for the 1994 Kooyong by-election
- Brian Walters SC, prominent human rights lawyer and candidate for the state seat of Melbourne at the 2010 Victorian election
- Andrew Wilkie, former Greens candidate and independent federal member for Denison (2010–19) and Clark (2019–present)
- Julian Burnside AO QC, prominent barrister, human rights and refugee advocate, and candidate for the federal seat of Kooyong in the 2019 federal election
- Jason Ball, former Australian rules football player and mental health advocate, and candidate for Higgins in the 2019 federal election

== Donors ==
For the 2015–2016 financial year, the top ten disclosed donors to the Greens were: Graeme Wood ($500,000), Duncan Turpie ($500,000), Electrical Trades Union of Australia ($320,000), Louise Crossley ($138,000), Anna Hackett ($100,000), Pater Investments ($100,000), Ruth Greble ($35,000), Minax Uriel Ptd Ltd ($39,800) and Chilla Bulbeck ($30,000).

Since 2017, the Australian Greens have implemented real-time disclosure of donations to them of over $1,000, in an effort to "clean up politics".

== See also ==
- List of Australian Greens parliamentarians
- Tasmanian Labor–Green Accord (1989–1990)
- Australian Capital Territory Labor–Greens coalition (2012–2024)
