= Nan Dirk de Graaf =

Sociologist

Nan Dirk de Graaf (born 1958) is a Dutch sociologist working in Nuffield College, University of Oxford. He is known for his work on social stratification, religion (with a focus on secularisation), political sociology, the impact of social mobility on a variety of social issues (e.g., health, cultural consumption, and political preferences), pro-social behaviour, as well as his books.

== Biography ==
Nan Dirk de Graaf joined Nuffield College in 2007 and is an Official Fellow and a Professor in Sociology. He obtained his PhD at Utrecht University (1988) and was a post-doc researcher at the Max Planck Institute for Education and Human Development in Berlin (1988-1989). De Graaf was a research fellow of the Royal Netherlands Academy (1990-1995) and a full Professor in Sociology at Nijmegen University (2001-2007). Between 2003 and 2007 he was the chair of the Inter-university Centre for Social Science Theory and Methodology (ICS).

== Research ==
=== Social Stratification ===
De Graaf’s work challenged some of the notions of the transmission of social capital as formulated by Pierre Bourdieu. For Bourdieu, the effect of families’ social origin on educational attainment is dependent on economic capital and increasingly on cultural resources of privileged parents. De Graaf and colleagues, contrary to Bourdieu’s claims, demonstrate that it is not the elites that were successfully transmitting their cultural capital on their children’s educational attainment, but rather the cultivating behaviour (particularly in reading) of lower-educated parents that improved their children’s educational attainment. Furthermore, social stratification is determined by the degree of heterogamy displayed by the marriages within a society, and it is also the result of social capital. People with more weak ties have access to more information, which leads to better life chances.

=== Consequences of Social Mobility ===
Social mobility, either intergenerational or intragenerational, is often assumed to have various important consequences, e.g. for health, cultural consumption, political preferences, and happiness. A problem with investigating mobility effects is that social mobility is the linear transformation ($X_1-X_2$) of any two status variables $X_1$ and $X_2$. Therefore, any regression equation predicting social mobility cannot be identified as all three terms are included. Michael Sobel had a theoretically elegant solution to this problem, the Diagonal Mobility Models (commonly known as Diagonal Reference Models, DRM). De Graaf and colleagues compared the DRM model with the conventional ones, and found it superior, and had applied DRMs to estimate the impact of:

(1) intergenerational class mobility on political preferences;

(2) intra- and inter-generational social mobility on happiness;

(3) the education of husband and wife on cultural consumption;

(4) class of wife and husband on their political preference and their class identity;

(5) the impact of the education of husband and wife;

(6) intergenerational educational mobility on health;

=== Religion and Secularisation ===
De Graaf maintains that despite secularisation, religion is still a central element of modern life. It shapes world-views, family lives, moral standards, as well as political preferences. With Kelley, De Graaf discovered that in secular societies children are more likely to become secular, but in secular societies parental religiosity is stronger positively associated with one’s own religiosity than in devout nations. De Graaf and colleagues have also shown that the state can accelerate the secular transition and, using Dutch event history data, that people are more likely to leave faith when they are in their late teens.

Lim and De Graaf tested Peter Berger’s theory of secularisation, which claims that in a religious pluralist society, religions must compete with one another and with non-religious institutions, which undermines a religion’s plausibility structure and leads to secularisation. For the first time, they tested its theoretical mechanisms by perceiving religious diversity from each religious group’s perspective. They did so because any specific local religious environment has different implications depending on one’s religion. Lim and De Graaf confirmed that religious diversity, especially the share of people of other religions, tends to reduce people’s religious involvement.

=== Political Sociology ===
One of De Graaf’s earliest field of research has been the changing impact of social class on political preferences. Consequently, he investigated the rise of new social classes, the social and cultural specialists within the old service class, and their political preferences. De Graaf and colleagues had also found that with decline in class voting there is also a decline in religious based voting. With Van Spanje, he investigated how established parties can reduce other (upcoming) parties’ electoral support (often Right-Wing Populist Parties). An analysis of 296 elections results in 28 countries show that parroting a party decreases its support only if that party is ostracised at the same time. A party can be seen as ostracised if its largest established competitor systematically rules out all political cooperation with it.

=== Pro-social Behaviour ===
Volunteering is not only helpful for society, but is also pays off at the individual level. Ruiter and De Graaf show that members of volunteering organisations are more likely to start new jobs which are better in terms of status and earnings than those of non-members. Furthermore, volunteering is beneficial when entering the labour market for the first time. Members of associations with more high-status co-members are more likely to get a new job and these jobs are of higher status too. Hence, voluntary association involvement provides an important additional network and that pays off. In another study, Ruiter and De Graaf confirmed that frequent churchgoers are more active in volunteer work and discovered that a devout national context has an additional positive effect. However, the difference between secular and religious people is substantially smaller in devout countries than in secular countries. Church attendance is not relevant for volunteering in devout countries. Furthermore, religious volunteering has a strong spillover effect, implying that religious citizens also volunteer more for secular organisations. This spillover effect is stronger for Catholics than for Protestants, non-Christians and non-religious individuals.

== Books ==
=== Handbook of Sociological Science (2022) ===
Edited together with Klarita Gërxhani and Werner Raub, the book aims at an integrative perspective on ongoing developments in sociological science. These developments share key methodological features and can therefore be labelled ‘rigorous sociology’. There are, however, numerous research approaches within the discipline, but this pluralism may ultimately lead to the fragmentation of the discipline. The book makes the case for progress and cumulative growth in sociological knowledge by emphasising a common core of basic methodological standards for theoretical and empirical work. The handbook sketches basic features of rigorous sociology related to theory construction, empirical research, methods, and contributions to policy-making.

=== Societal Problems as Public Bads (2019) ===
Written together with Dingeman Wiertz, this textbook discusses many pressing problems facing societies today: corruption, crime, economic inequality, religious extremism, financial crises, global warming, population ageing, gender inequalities, and the challenges of large scale migration. The book demonstrates that many similar social processes lie behind these seemingly disparate problems. The problems can often be traced back to actions that are perfectly rational or well-intended from an individual perspective, but that, taken together, give rise to undesirable societal outcomes. The book also explains why some problems rank higher on the public agenda than others. Moreover, it shows how government intervention may sometimes provide a cure, yet in other times exacerbate existing problems or create new problems of its own.

=== Political Choice Matters (2013) ===
In 2013, together with Geoffrey Evans, De Graaf edited "Political Choice Matters: Explaining the strength of class and religious cleavages in cross-national perspective". The volume investigates the role of ideological positions adopted by political parties in shaping the extent of class and religious voting in contemporary democracies. The key question therefore is how are political cleavages formed and how do they change? Combining over-time, cross-national data and multi-level research designs, it demonstrates that parties' programmatic positions can provide voters with choice sets that accentuate or diminish political cleavages. It also simultaneously tests alternative, ‘bottom up’, approaches that attribute changes in class and religious voting to individualisation processes associated with socio-economic development and secularisation. There are detailed case studies of eleven European and Anglo-democracies examining, mostly, election studies ranging from the post-war period until the early 21st century. These studies are augmented by a pooled cross-national and overtime analysis of 15 Western democracies using an unprecedented dataset of 188 national pooled surveys.
