= Secularization =

Societal transition away from religion

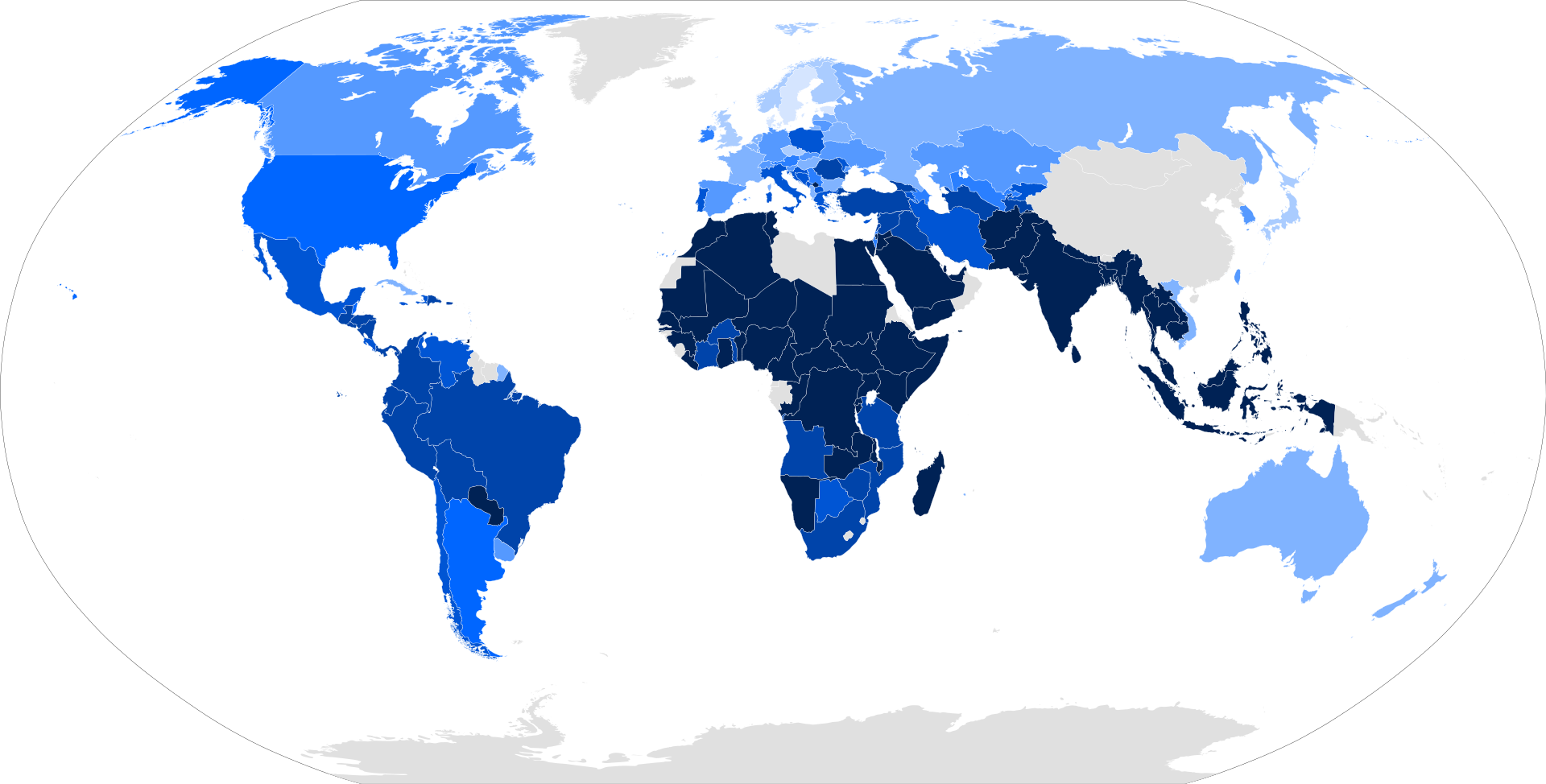
Importance of religion by country in a 2008–2009 poll by Gallup

In sociology, secularization (British English: secularisation) is a multilayered concept that generally denotes "a transition from a religious to a more worldly level." There are many types of secularization and most do not lead to atheism or irreligion, nor are they automatically antithetical to religion. Secularization has different connotations such as implying differentiation of secular from religious domains, the marginalization of religion in those domains, or it may also entail the transformation of religion as a result of its recharacterization (e.g., as a private concern, or as a non-political matter or issue).

The secularization thesis expresses the idea that through the lens of the European enlightenment modernization, rationalization, combined with the ascent of science and technology, religious authority diminishes in all aspects of social life and governance. Pew Research Center notes that economic development is positively correlated with less religiousness. According to Pippa Norris and Ronald Inglehart, "virtually all advanced industrial societies" have become more secular in recent decades.

The secularization thesis was challenged in 1999 by Peter L. Berger, who coined the term desecularization to refer to a resurgence of religion after a period of secularization, with examples such as the Islamic revival since the 1970s, in particular the Iranian Revolution, and the resurgence of religion in post-Soviet Russia. Some researchers have said that people with religious beliefs may be increasing as a share of world population, due to higher fertility rates in poorer, more religious countries, but Pew Research Center estimates that between 2010 and 2020, the religiously unaffiliated share of world population increased from 23.3% to 24.2%.

There is no particular monolithic direction or trend for secularization since, even in Europe, the trends in religious history and demographic religious measures (e.g., belief, belonging, etc.) are mixed and make the region an exception compared to other parts of the world. There are many debates about the boundaries of both religion and secular and some have suggested "post-secular" models since there are areas of growth of religious influence which challenge the underlying assumptions on conventional views on secularism. Global studies show that many people who do not identify with a religion still hold religious beliefs and participate in religious practices. The secular vs religion dichotomy is false and neither concept is mutually exclusive. Both "religion" and "secular" are Western terms and concepts that are not universal across cultures, languages, or time.

== Overview ==
Secularization, in the main sociological meaning of the term, involves the historical process in which religion declines in social and cultural significance. As a result of secularization, the role of religion in modern societies becomes restricted. In secularized societies, faith lacks cultural authority, and religious organizations have little social power.

Secularization has many levels of meaning, both as a theory and as a political process. Karl Marx (1818–1883), Sigmund Freud (1856–1939), Max Weber (1864–1920), and Émile Durkheim (1858–1917) postulated that the modernization of society would include a decline in levels of formal religiosity. Study of this process seeks to determine the manner in which, or extent to which religious creeds, practices, and institutions are losing social significance. Some theorists argue that the secularization of modern civilization partly results from our inability to adapt the broad ethical and spiritual needs of people to the increasingly fast advance of the physical sciences.

Nonetheless, cross-cultural studies indicate that people in general do not think of natural and supernatural explanations as antagonistic or dichotomous, but instead see them as coexisting and complementary. The reconciliation of natural and supernatural explanations is normal and pervasive from a psychological standpoint across cultures.

In contrast to the "modernization" thesis, Christian Smith and others argue that intellectual and cultural élites promote secularization to enhance their own status and influence. Smith believes that intellectuals have an inherent tendency to be hostile to their native cultures, causing them to embrace secularism.

According to Jack David Eller, secularization is compatible with religion since most versions of secularity do not lead to atheism or irreligion. Global studies show that many people who do not identify with a religion, still hold religious beliefs and participate in religious practices, thus complicating the situation.

== Background ==
Secularization is sometimes credited both to the cultural shifts in society following the emergence of rationality and the development of science as a substitute for superstition—Max Weber called this process the "disenchantment of the world"—and to the changes made by religious institutions to compensate. At the most basic stages, this begins with a slow transition from oral traditions to a writing culture that diffuses knowledge. This first reduces the authority of clerics as the custodians of revealed knowledge. The shift of responsibility for education from the family and community to the state has had two consequences:

- Collective conscience as defined by Durkheim is diminished;
- Religion becomes a matter of individual choice rather than an observed social obligation.

A major issue in the study of secularization is the extent to which certain trends such as decreased attendance at places of worship indicate a decrease in religiosity or simply a privatization of religious belief, where religious beliefs no longer play a dominant role in public life or in other aspects of decision making.

== Definitions ==
Jack David Eller (2010) outlined Peter Glasner's 10 different institutional, normative, or cognitive versions of secularization, most of which do not lead to irreligion or atheism:

1. Routinization — institutionalizing religion through integration into the society
2. Differentiation — a redefined place or relation to society such as in pluralization
3. Disengagement — the detachment of certain facets of social life from religion
4. Transformation — change over time (e.g., Protestantism developed in Christianity)
5. Generalization — where religion becomes less specific, more abstract, and inclusive
6. Segmentation — the development of specialized religious institutions coexisting with other social institutions
7. Desacralization — distancing the references of the "supernatural" from the material world
8. Decline — the reduction in quantitative measures of religious identification and participation
9. Secularization — pluralism through which society moves away from the "sacred" and toward the "profane"
10. Secularism — the only form that leads to outright rejection of religion, amounting to atheism

C. John Sommerville (1998) outlined six uses of the term secularization in the scientific literature. The first five are more along the lines of 'definitions' while the sixth is more of a 'clarification of use':

1. When discussing macro social structures, secularization can refer to differentiation: a process in which the various aspects of society, economic, political, legal, and moral, become increasingly specialized and distinct from one another.
2. When discussing individual institutions, secularization can denote the transformation of a religion into a secular institution. Examples would be the evolution of institutions such as Harvard University from a predominantly religious institution into a secular institution (with a divinity school now housing the religious element illustrating differentiation).
3. When discussing activities, secularization refers to the transfer of activities from religious to secular institutions, such as a shift in the provision of social services from churches to the government.
4. When discussing mentalities, secularization refers to the transition from ultimate concerns to proximate concerns, e.g., individuals in the West are now more likely to moderate their behavior in response to more immediately applicable consequences rather than out of concern for post-mortem consequences. This is a personal religious decline or movement toward a secular lifestyle.
5. When discussing populations, secularization refers to broad patterns of societal decline in levels of religiosity as opposed to the individual-level secularization of (4) above. This understanding of secularization is also distinct from (1) above in that it refers specifically to religious decline rather than societal differentiation.
6. When discussing religion, secularization can only be used unambiguously to refer to religion in a generic sense. For example, a reference to Christianity is not clear unless one specifies exactly which denominations of Christianity are being discussed.

Abdel Wahab Elmessiri (2002) outlined two meanings of the term secularization:

1. Partial Secularization: which is the common meaning of the word, and expresses "the separation between religion and state".
2. Complete Secularization: this definition is not limited to the partial definition, but exceeds it to "The separation between all (religion, moral, and human) values, and (not just the state) but also to (the human nature in its public and private sides), so that the holiness is removed from the world, and this world is transformed into a usable matter that can be employed for the sake of the strong".

== History ==
Secularism's origins can be traced to the Bible itself and fleshed out throughout Christian history into the modern era. "Secular" is a part of the Christian church's history, which even has secular clergy since the medieval period. Furthermore, secular and religious entities were not separated in the medieval period, but coexisted and interacted naturally. Significant contributions to principles used in modern secularism came from prominent theologians and Christian writers such as St. Augustine, William of Ockham, Marsilius of Padua, Martin Luther, Roger Williams, John Locke and Talleyrand.

The term "secularization" also has additional meanings, primarily historical and religious. Applied to church property, historically it refers to the seizure of church lands and buildings, such as Henry VIII's 16th-century dissolution of the monasteries in England and the later acts during the 18th-century French Revolution, as well as by various anti-clerical enlightened absolutist European governments during the 18th and 19th centuries, which resulted in the expulsion and suppression of the religious communities which occupied them. The 19th-century Kulturkampf in Germany and Switzerland and similar events in many other countries also were expressions of secularization.

The term "secularization" can also mean the lifting of monastic restrictions from a member of the clergy, and to deconsecration, removing the consecration of a religious building so that it may be used for other purposes. The first use of "secular" as a change from religion to the mundane is from the 16th century that referred to transforming ecclesiastical possessions for civil purposes, such as monasteries to hospitals; and by the 19th century it gained traction as a political object of secularist movements. In the 20th century, "secularization" had diversified into various versions in light of the diversity of experiences from different cultures and institutions. Scholars recognize that secularity is structured by Protestant models of Christianity, shares a parallel language to religion, and intensifies Protestant features such as iconoclasm and skepticism towards rituals, and emphasizes beliefs. In doing so, secularism perpetuates Christian traits under a different name.

Still another form of secularization refers to the act of Prince-Bishops or holders of a position in a Monastic or Military Order - holding a combined religious and secular authority under the Catholic Church - who broke away and made themselves into completely secular (typically, Protestant) hereditary rulers. For example, Gotthard Kettler (1517–1587), the last Master of the Livonian Order, converted to Lutheranism, secularised (and took to himself) the lands of Semigallia and Courland which he had held on behalf of the order – which enabled him to marry and leave to his descendants the Duchy of Courland and Semigallia. Perhaps the most widely known example of such secularization is that of 1525, which led to the establishment of Prussia, a state which would later become a major power in European politics.

The 1960s saw a trend toward increasing secularization in Western Europe, North America, Australia, and New Zealand. This transformation accompanied major social factors: economic prosperity, youth rebelling against the rules and conventions of society, sexual revolution, women's liberation, radical theology, and radical politics. A study found evidence that a rise in secularization generally has preceded economic growth over the past century. The multilevel, time-lagged regressions also indicate that tolerance for individual rights predicted 20th century economic growth even better than secularization.

According to another study, the rise of automation (robotics and AI) could accelerate secularization throughout the 21st century in many world regions, even though "this correlation does not prove any meaningful connection between automation and religious decline". The findings suggest that automation may reduce the instrumental value of religion, as technology provides secular alternatives for solving problems traditionally addressed by religion.

Pope Francis' view of secularization was characterised by biographer Austen Ivereigh as a "God-given shock" that gives the church a chance to change how it relates to the world. In 2022, Francis expressed regret that Christianity has lost significance after secularization, but criticised what he described as the "negative view" that sees its faith as an "armour" and believes that "the world is evil, sin reigns", but which masks a "nostalgia for a sacralised world, a bygone society in which the Church and her ministers had greater power and social relevance". He advocated a "discerning view" that sees secularization as a legitimate effort, compatible with religion, to discover the laws governing human life.

== Sociological use and differentiation ==
As studied by sociologists, one of the major themes of secularization is that of "differentiation"—i.e., the tendency for areas of life to become more distinct and specialized as a society becomes modernized. European sociology, influenced by anthropology, was interested in the process of change from the so-called primitive societies to increasingly advanced societies. In the United States, the emphasis was initially on change as an aspect of progress, but Talcott Parsons refocused on society as a system immersed in a constant process of increased differentiation, which he saw as a process in which new institutions take over the tasks necessary in a society to guarantee its survival as the original monolithic institutions break up. This is a devolution from single, less differentiated institutions to an increasingly differentiated subset of institutions.

Following Parsons, this concept of differentiation has been widely applied. As phrased by José Casanova, this "core and the central thesis of the theory of secularization is the conceptualization of the process of societal modernization as a process of functional differentiation and emancipation of the secular spheres—primarily the state, the economy, and science—from the religious sphere and the concomitant differentiation and specialization of religion within its own newly found religious sphere". Casanova also describes this as the theory of "privatization" of religion, which he partially criticizes. While criticizing certain aspects of the traditional sociological theory of secularization, however, David Martin argues that the concept of social differentiation has been its "most useful element".

== Current issues in secularization ==
At present, secularization as understood in the West is being debated in the sociology of religion. In his works Legitimacy of the Modern Age (1966) and The Genesis of the Copernican World (1975), Hans Blumenberg has rejected the idea of a historical continuity – fundamental to the so-called 'theorem of secularization'; the Modern age in his view represents an independent epoch opposed to Antiquity and the Middle Ages by a rehabilitation of human curiosity in reaction to theological absolutism. "Blumenberg targets Löwith's argument that progress is the secularization of Hebrew and Christian beliefs and argues to the contrary that the modern age, including its belief in progress, grew out of a new secular self-affirmation of culture against the Christian tradition." Wolfhart Pannenberg, a student of Löwith, has continued the debate against Blumenberg. Hans Blumberg's assumption that secularization did not exactly grow out of a western-Christian tradition also seems to be in line with more recent findings by Christoph Kleine and Monika Wohlrab-Sahr who have shown that similar historical developments can also be found in largely non-Christian contexts such as Japan or Sri Lanka.

Building on this conversation, Charles Taylor introduces a shift in how secularity is defined in his A Secular Age (2007). He challenges what he calls 'the subtraction thesis' – the notion that secularism is the result of science and rationality 'subtracting' religion from public life.

Proponents of "secularization theory" demonstrate widespread declines in the prevalence of religious belief throughout the West, particularly in Europe. Some scholars (e.g., Rodney Stark, Peter Berger) have argued that levels of religiosity are not declining, while other scholars (e.g., Mark Chaves, N. J. Demerath) have countered by introducing the idea of 'neo-secularization', which broadens the definition of secularization to include the decline of religious authority and its ability to influence society.

In other words, rather than using the proportion of irreligious apostates as the sole measure of secularity, 'neo-secularization' argues that individuals increasingly look outside of religion for authoritative positions. 'Neo-secularizationists' would argue that religion has diminishing authority on issues such as birth control, and argue that religion's authority is declining and secularization is taking place even if religious affiliation may not be declining in the United States (a debate still taking place).

Finally, some claim that demographic forces offset the process of secularization, and may do so to such an extent that individuals can consistently drift away from religion even as society becomes more religious. This is especially the case in societies like Israel (with the ultra-Orthodox and religious Zionists) where committed religious groups have several times the birth rate of seculars. The religious fertility effect operates to a greater or lesser extent in all countries, and is amplified in the West by religious immigration. For instance, even as the white British became more secular, London, England, has become more religious in the past 25 years as religious immigrants and their descendants have increased their share of the population. Across the board, the question of secularization has generated considerable (and occasionally heated) debates in the social sciences.

== Criticism of secularization theory ==
Today, criticism is directed against the assertion that religion has become less important in the modern age. Critics point to developments in South Korea, Russia and the United States. The combination of institutional religion with other interests, such as economic or political interests, leads to the strengthening of these religions in their respective societies. However, there are also factors that lead to a diminishing importance of religion. This is the main trend in Western Europe. Some scholars point to the permanent interplay between secularization and desecularization in Western societies. For example, after the first democratic revolutions in the 18th and 19th centuries, religious traditions quickly regained strength. It has also been denied that secularization ever took place in the United States - a country that was co-founded by many religious sectarians who were expelled from their home countries and where witches were still being persecuted in 1692. Detlef Pollack, on the other hand, argues that the higher religiosity of Americans compared to Europeans is well compatible with the assumptions of secularization theory: among other things, it can be explained by the unusually high degree of existential insecurity and social inequality in the United States and the millions of religious immigrants from Latin America. However, liberal Americans have increasingly distanced themselves from church and religion due to the growing fusion of evangelical and conservative positions.

Another point of criticism in the discourse on secularization is the inadequate examination of the Eurocentric nature of general terms, concepts, and definitions. For example, the religious studies scholar and intercultural theologian Michael Bergunder criticizes the fact that the terms religion and esotericism are tainted by a Eurocentric origin thinking. This inaccurate use of the terms hinders a constructive discussion about secularization in a global context. As an alternative, Bergunder argues for a historicization from the present of these general terms according to Foucault's. In this way, hitherto unseen connections and the origins of the modern understanding of secularization from the 19th century can be revealed.

== Regional developments ==
State religion by country

=== United States ===
==== 1870–1930 ====
Christian Smith examined the secularization of American public life between 1870 and 1930. He noted that in 1870 a Protestant establishment thoroughly dominated American culture and its public institutions. By the turn of the 20th century, however, positivism had displaced the Baconian method (which had hitherto bolstered natural theology) and higher education had been thoroughly secularized. In the 1910s, "legal realism" gained prominence, de-emphasizing the religious basis for law. That same decade, publishing houses emerged that were independent of the Protestant establishment. During the 1920s, secularization extended into popular culture and mass public education ceased to be under Protestant cultural influence. Although the general public was still highly religious during this time period, by 1930 the old Protestant establishment was in "shambles".

Key to understanding the secularization, Smith argues, was the rise of an elite intellectual class skeptical of religious orthodoxies and influenced by the European Enlightenment tradition. They consciously sought to displace a Protestant establishment they saw as standing in their way.

==== 2000–2021 ====
Annual Gallup polls from 2008 through 2015 showed that the fraction of Americans who did not identify with any particular religion steadily rose from 14.6% in 2008 to 19.6% in 2015. At the same time, the fraction of Americans identifying as Christians sank from 80.1% to 69% in 2021. In December 2021, ~21% of Americans declared no religious identity or preference. Given that non-Christian religions stayed roughly the same (at about 5–7% from 2008 to 2021), secularization thus seems to have affected primarily Christians.

However, researchers argue that being unaffiliated does not automatically mean objectively nonreligious since most of the unaffiliated do still hold some religious and spiritual beliefs. For example, 72% of American unaffiliated or "Nones" believe in God or a Higher Power. The "None" response is more of an indicator for lacking affiliation than an active measure for irreligiosity, and a majority of the "Nones" can either be conventionally religious or "spiritual".

=== Britain ===
==== History ====
In Britain, secularization came much later than in most of Western Europe. It began in the 1960s as part of a much larger social and cultural revolution. Until then, the post-World War II period had seen a revival of religiosity in Britain. Sociologists and historians have engaged in vigorous debates over when it started, how fast it happened, and what caused it.

Sponsorship by the British royalty, the British aristocracy, and influential local gentry provided an important support system for organized religion in the United Kingdom. The sponsorship faded away in the 20th century, as the local élites were no longer so powerful or so financially able to subsidize their favorite activities. In coal-mining districts, local collieries typically funded local chapels, but that ended as the industry grew distressed and the unionized miners rejected élite interference in their local affairs. This allowed secularizing forces to gain strength.

==== Recent developments ====
Data from the annual British Social Attitudes survey and the biennial European Social Survey suggest that the proportion of Britons who identify as Christian fell from 55% (in 1983) to 43% (in 2015). While members of non-Christian religions – principally Muslims and Hindus – quadrupled, the non-religious ("nones") now make up 53% of the British population. More than six in 10 "nones" were brought up as Christians, mainly Anglican or Catholic. Only 2% of "nones" were raised in religions other than Christian. People who were brought up to practice a religion, but who now identify as having no religion, so-called "non-verts", had different rates of leaving the religion of their upbringing, namely 14% for Jews, 10% for Muslims and Sikhs, and 6% for Hindus. The proportions of the non-religious who convert to a faith are small: 3% now identify as Anglicans, less than 0.5% convert to Catholicism, 2% join other Christian denominations, and 2% convert to non-Christian faiths.

In 2018, Pew Research Center found that a large majority (89%) of those who were raised as Christians in the United Kingdom still identify as such, while the remainder mostly self-identify as religiously unaffiliated.

=== Spain ===
Spain used to be one of the most religious countries in Europe, but secularization has progressed fast during the past few decades. This was partly due to the role of the Catholic Church constituting the "doctrinal basis of the most significant organizations of the anti-democratic and anti-liberal right-wing" and the resulting anti-clericalism that was one of the roots of the Spanish civil war. Notably, the dictatorship of Francisco Franco's core ideology was national Catholicism.

However, agreements linked to the constitution of 1978 separated church and state. In 2001, 82% of Spaniards identified as Catholic but only half did in 2021. Only around 20% of Spaniards go to mass regularly and only 20% of weddings are taking place in a church (2019). Similarly, divorce was legalized in 1981, as was abortion and same-sex marriage soon after.

=== Germany ===
Like other European countries, Germany has recorded a decrease in religiosity (in terms of proportion of individuals affiliated to a Church and baptisms for example) but the trends in East and West Germany are significantly different. In East Germany, the process of secularization has been significantly quicker. These differences are explained by sociologists (Jörg Stolz, Detlef Pollack and Nan Dirk de Graaf) by the State repression in the 1950s and 1960s, which challenges predictions of natural cohort replacements stated by the Voas model.

=== Asia ===
==== India ====
India, post-independence, has seen the emergence of an assertive secular state.

==== China ====
One traditional view of Chinese culture sees the teachings of Confucianism – influential over many centuries – as basically secular.

Chang Pao-min summarises perceived historical consequences of very early secularization in China:

The early secularization of Chinese society, which must be recognized as a sign of modernity [...] has ironically left China for centuries without a powerful and stable source of morality and law. All this simply means that the pursuit of wealth or power or simply the competition for survival can be and often has been ruthless without any sense of restraint. [...] Along with the early secularization of Chinese society which was equally early, the concomitant demise of feudalism and hereditary aristocracy, another remarkable development, transformed China earlier than any other country into a unitary system politically, with one single power centre. It also rendered Chinese society much more egalitarian than Western Europe and Japan.

In this arguably secular setting, the Chinese Communist Party of the People's Republic of China promoted deliberate secularization.

=== Arab world ===
Many countries in the Arab world show signs of increasing secularization. For instance, in Egypt, support for imposing sharia (Islamic law) fell from 84% in 2011 to 34% in 2016. Egyptians also pray less: among older Egyptians (55+) 90% prayed daily in 2011. Among the younger generation (age 18–24) that fraction was only 70% in 2011. By contrast, in 2016 these numbers had fallen to <80% (55+) and <40% (18–24). The other age groups were in between these values. In Lebanon and Morocco, the number of people listening to daily recitals of the Quran fell by half from 2011 to 2016. Some of these developments seem to be driven by need, e.g. by stagnating incomes which force women to contribute to household income and therefore to work. High living costs delay marriage and, as a consequence, seem to encourage pre-marital sex. However, in other countries, such as Jordan and Palestine, support for sharia and Islamist ideas seems to grow. Even in countries in which secularization is growing, there are backlashes. For instance, the president of Egypt, Abdel-Fattah al-Sisi, has banned hundreds of newspapers and websites who may provoke opposition.

== See also ==
- Christian persecution complex – Belief that Christianity is oppressed in the Western world
- Death of God theology – Christian theological field of study
- Decline of Christianity in the Western world
- Modernity – Historical period and socio-cultural norm or attitude
- Progressivism – Political philosophy in support of progress and/or reform
- Rational choice theory of religion
- Secular state – State or country without a state religion
- Secularism – Position that religion should not influence civic and state affairs
- Secularity – State of being separate from religion
- Separation of church and state – Principle to separate religious and civil institutions
- Sociology of religion
- State religion – Religion or creed endorsed by the state
- The Enlightenment – European cultural movement
