= Jörg Stolz =

Swiss German sociologist of religions

Jörg Stolz (born June 19, 1967, in Zürich, Switzerland) is a Swiss and German sociologist, Professor of Sociology of religion at the University of Lausanne, Switzerland. His research mainly focuses on secularization, evangelicalism, and religiosity. He combines an explanatory approach with quantitative methods and mixed methods.

== Early life ==
Jörg Stolz was born in 1967 in Zürich. His father was a Swiss theologian, Fritz Stolz. Between 1987 and 1994, he studied sociology, economy and philosophy at the Universität Zürich, and spent one year in Germany at the Bielefeld University where he followed Niklas Luhmann's teachings. After obtaining his Licence, he completed his Ph.D at the Universität Zürich and published his thesis. He completed a post-doc between Paris with Raymond Boudon and Mannheim with Hartmut Esser.

== Career ==
Jörg Stolz is Professor ordinarius at the University of Lausanne since 2002 where he holds the chair of sociology of religions. He was President of the International Society for the Sociology of Religion between 2016 and 2018.

His work on secularization mainly focuses on the religious-secular competition and Church disaffiliations. His work has been discussed in local newspapers and by other scholars. He also investigates evangelicalism and religiosity. He is the author and co-author of different peer-reviewed papers, chapters, and books

== Main works ==
- Stolz, J., Könemann, J., Schneuwly Purdie, M., Englberger, T. and Krüggeler, M. (2016). (Un)Believing in modern society. Religion, spirituality, and religious-secular competition. London: Routledge. ISBN 978-1-138-54877-0
- Stolz, J., Favre, O., Gachet, C. and Buchard, E. (2014). Phänomen Freikirchen. Analysen eines wettbewerbsstarken Milieus. Zürich: TVZ. ISBN 978-3-290-22025-9
- Stolz, J. and Ballif, E. (2010). Die Zukunft der Reformierten. Gesellschaftliche Megatrends - kirchliche Reaktionen. Zürich: TVZ. ISBN 978-3-290-17556-6
- Baumann, M. and Stolz, J. (2007). Eine Schweiz - viele Religionen. Risiken und Chancen des Zusammenlebens. Bielefeld: Transcript. ISBN 978-3-8394-0524-6
