= Gender inequality in Australia =

Gender inequality can be defined as the unequal treatment of individuals based on their gender. Individuals can be marginalised and discriminated from society and be restricted to participate in society due to their gender. Australian women, men, and transgender and non-binary people may all experience aspects of gender inequality. In 2017, Australia ranked as the 35th best country for gender equality.

== Legislation ==
Various legislation such as the Sex Discrimination Act 1984 addresses gender inequality. The legislation covers the issues of discrimination in education, partnerships, marital status, sexual harassment and potential pregnancy. This legislation was pushed and supported by the Bill put forward by South Australia's Premier, Don Dunstan in 1975.

The Workplace Gender Equality Agency is an Australian Government statutory agency charged with promoting and improving gender equality in Australian workplaces. It is responsible for administering the Workplace Gender Equality Act 2012, which replaced the Equal Opportunity for Women in the Workplace Act 1999. The Workplace Gender Equality Agency was formerly known as the Equal Opportunity for Women in the Workplace Agency.

== Gender pay gap ==
The gender pay gap refers to men and women not receiving equal pay for equal work. In Australia, the principle of "equal pay for equal work" was introduced in 1969. Anti-discrimination on the basis of sex was legislated in 1984. All government statistics in this area do not compare like-for-like roles but are an average on both male and female total wages.

Between 1990 and 2009, the gender pay gap remained within a narrow range of between 15 and 17%. In November 2017, the Australian gender pay gap was 15.3%. In 2018, it was reported that Australia's full-time gender pay gap was 14.6% and women earnt on average A$244.80 per week less than men. It was also reported that Western Australia had the highest pay gap by state and territory (22.4%), while the lowest pay gap was reported in Tasmania (9.7%). As well, the highest pay gap by industry in Australia was Financial and Insurance Services (26.6%) and the lowest pay gap by industry was Public Administration and Safety (5.8%).

Studies show that unexplained differences in wages may be due to direct discrimination, or to other unmeasured differences between men and women, calculations do not account for education, experience or area of work so little can be known about the causes.

Studies that examine the gender pay gap across the entire wage distribution find that the gender pay gap is much greater among high wage earners than among low wage earners even after controlling for various individual and workplace related factors. These results indicate that a glass ceiling may be found in the Australian labour market.

== Violence ==
=== Sexual harassment violence ===
Many Australians have experienced sexual harassment and/or sexual or physical violence in their lifetime. In 2022, a survey by the Australian Human Rights Commission found that 41% of women, and 26% of men have experienced sexual harassment in the workplace within the past 5 years.

It was reported in 2018, that Aboriginal and Torres Strait Islander women experience violence at around twice the rate of non-Indigenous women.

=== Domestic violence ===
In Australia, 17% of women and 6.1% of men have experienced intimate partner violence since the age of 15. 23% of women and 16% of men have experienced emotional abuse since the age of 15. It was also reported in 2018 that Aboriginal and Torres Strait Islander women are 34 times more likely to be hospitalised from domestic violence than non-Indigenous Australian women. Due to these high rates, it was estimated in 2015-2016 that domestic violence against women and their children was costing the Australian Government $22 billion.

=== Imprisonment ===
Within prisons throughout Australia, the male population makes up the majority of those imprisoned. Specifically in New South Wales, over 9 in 10 (92%) of prisoners were male.

The rate of male prisoners has continued to increase in recent years. Growing from 398 to 406 prisoners per 100,000 male adult population.

Among the imprisoned population of Australia, there is a vast over-representation of Aboriginal and Torres Strait Islander peoples, accounting for just over a quarter (27%) of the Australian prisoner population. This is despite only accounting for 2% of the Australian population. These incarceration rates regarding male Aboriginal and Torres Strait Islander individuals increased by 22.4% between 2000 and 2010.

=== Crime ===
The male population of Australia disproportionately commits violence at a much higher rate than the rest of the Australian population.

A report released in Victoria by the Crime Statistics Agency reported that around 80% of all crime in Australia was committed by men.

== Health ==
Differences in health is illustrated through the data retrieved from the ABS, where it gap between men and women in terms of life expectancy. In 1998, the life expectancy of men was 75.9 compared to 81.5 for women.

Australian women have a higher life expectancy than men, with women's life expectancy being 84.2 years and men's life expectancy of 79.7. Despite this discrepancy, women's health gets four times more funding than men's health, with women's health getting $833 million since 2003 and men's health got less than $200 million. Men are 60% more likely to die from cancer. There is no reliable test for prostate cancer, but there is one for breast cancer, despite prostate cancer being a bigger killer than breast cancer.

== Homelessness ==
Statistics regarding homelessness within Australia have revealed distinct variances in the experiences of differing genders.

Of people who stay in boarding houses and "sleep rough", statistics were largely skewed towards the male population, 74.8% and 67.6% of the homeless population, respectively. However, causes of homelessness differed amongst younger and older populations of homeless males. Whilst younger men aged 15–24 reported family breakdowns, older males were more likely to cite financial crisis, or an inability to afford housing.

Among these sub-groups of the male homeless population, recent migrants to Australia were overrepresented, making up 15% of the homeless population. Within this 15%, 60% of migrants identified as male.

== Retirement ==
Many women have substantially lower superannuation payouts for retirement than men in Australia. In 2015–2016, it was reported that the average super payout for an Australian man was $270,710, while the average super payout for an Australian woman was $157,050. This means, the average Australian woman had $113,660 less superannuation for retirement than the average Australian man. As a result of many women having fewer superannuation funds than men, it can often lead to women having financial hardships in retirement. Women are more likely to experience poverty when retired and more likely to be reliant and dependent on the Age Pension compared to men. In 2018, it was reported that 55% of women aged 65 years or more were receiving the Age Pension.

== Occupational segregation ==
In Australia, occupational segregation is very present in many industries. Occupations are highly segregated by gender which results in male-dominated occupations and female-dominated occupations. In 2016, it was reported that Construction and Mining industries had the highest representation of men. 88.3% of workers in construction industries and 86.3% in mining industries were men. Whereas, it was reported that Health Care and Social Assistance, and Education and Training industries had the highest representation of women. Women made up 78.3% workers in Health Care and Social Assistance, and Women accounted for 70.9% of Education and Training industries in 2016.

It is also important to note that in eight industries women made up less than 40% of all workers in 2016. These industries include Information Media and Telecommunications (37.6%); Agriculture, Forestry and Fishing (30.9%); Wholesale Trade (30.1%); Manufacturing (27.3%); Electricity, Gas, Water and Waste Services (22.4%); Transport, Postal and Warehousing (21.7%); Mining (13.7%); and Construction (11.7%).

== Mental health issues and addiction ==
Men's mental health outcomes throughout Australia are disproportionate to those experienced by a number of populations in Australia.

Men are three times more likely to commit suicide than women across all Australian states and territories. This is despite the fact that more women (24.6%) than men (18%) have experienced mental health disorders in the past 12 months.

Despite this high prevalence of suicide amongst the Australian male population, in 2013 only 27% of men sought out professional mental health services, compared to 40% of women.

Men also had twice the rate of substance abuse compared to the general population. This rate of substance abuse is also five times more likely amongst those who have previously been incarcerated.

In attempting to explain these disproportionate figures regarding men's mental health in Australia, a qualitative study into men's suicide rates identified substantial misinterpretation of men regarding their behaviour and thinking. The CEO of national mental health charity SANE Australia suggested that, "There's a belief that the very idea of being a man is that you deal with stuff and you don't reach out or connect. Untreated, the problem snowballs. The combination of that and the notion of having to deal with it alone, is the reason behind high suicide rates".

== Societal roles ==
=== Carers ===
Typically, women take on roles of being carers in society. In 2018, it was reported that 68% of primary carers are women, 70% of primary unpaid carers for children are women, and 58% of primary unpaid carers for the elderly and people with a disability or long-term health conditions are women. As a result, women spend 64.4% of their total work day performing unpaid care work, compared to men who spend 36.1% of their total work day performing unpaid care work.This equates to women spending almost twice as many hours performing unpaid care work each day compared to men. Women are also spending almost three times as much time each day caring for children compared to men.

== Issues for transgender and non-binary people ==
=== Work life and economics ===
The economic life of the gender diverse community in Australia is distinctly inconsistent compared to other populations throughout Australia.

In study conducted by Beyond Blue into the mental health of transgender Australians, a number of participants identified difficulty in finding employment. This difficulty stemmed directly from their gender identity. Within the same study, contributors also reported instances of loss of employment following the decision to transition, or during their transition process.

Apart from difficulty in finding and retaining employment, pay rates for gender diverse individuals differ from those of the greater Australian community. Dawn Hough, director of support program "Pride in Diversity", puts forth that pay equity rates for transgender and intersex individuals may be even lower than others in the LGBTQI community.

=== Societal discrimination ===
Within Australian society, transgender and other gender diverse peoples have experienced dramatic occurrences of harassment and discrimination.

These examples of harassment and discrimination occur in a variety of ways. Purposely misgendering an individual who identifies as gender diverse is an act of discrimination with severe ramifications for the mental health of transgender peoples. Australia came a close second to the United States of America in stating that they would intentionally misgender a trans person as an act of disrespect.

Considering these statistics, it is unsurprising that this same survey also found that only two in five cisgender individuals were willing to use correct pronouns when referring to transgender peoples. Even smaller, only one in five would use the gender neutral term "they" when referring to non-binary or gender non-conforming individuals.

Other occurrences of discrimination include forms of verbal and physical abuse. In terms of verbal abuse, around two in three (66%) of trans and gender-diverse people reported that they had experienced verbal abuse based solely on their gender identity. This harassment was most often expressed by strangers calling out to them on streets, yet also involved abuse delivered by immediate family members in close confines.

More than one in five (21%), transgender and gender diverse individuals also stated that they had experienced physical abuse. These occurrences most often occurred on the street, yet were also closely followed by instances of violence at school and on public transport.

Unsurprisingly, the same study also revealed that 43% of trans and gender non-conforming individuals felt unsafe on public streets, with 32% also feeling unsafe on public transport. It was also shown that transgender and gender diverse people actively avoided some public places for their own safety. These places were most often gendered spaces, including bathrooms and public change rooms.

=== Mental health ===
Transgender and gender diverse individuals have been proven to have dramatically reduced mental health outcomes than the greater Australian population.

Trans individuals have been identified as a high-risk group for suicide, with one in five respondents reporting they had thoughts of suicidal ideation or self-harm in at least half the days of the previous fortnight. Within the same survey, over half (57.2%) of respondents reported they had been diagnosed with depression, with younger individuals more likely to report poorer mental health than older respondents.

Authors of the study also identified trans women as being over five times more likely to commit suicide than the general population, whilst trans men were more than double. Authors of the study could not pinpoint the exact reasoning for this discrepancy in mental health outcomes even among trans individuals. However, those analysing this data reported that this might be due to trans women having fewer sources of support, as they more often live alone. Authors also noted that trans women might find it more difficult to transition within society, due to the powerful effects of testosterone on bone structure.

In regards to factors affecting a positive effect on their mental health, transgender and gender diverse peoples reported that feeling acknowledged and supported in their gender identity along with feeling free to express their identity as they wish had positive repercussions on their mental health outcomes.

Factors that had distinct negative impacts on mental health included, obviously, discrimination and harassment. Other negative impacts included dysmorphia, due to being unable to 'medically' transition. This is often a result of excessive medical costs. Feeling unaccepted by friends and family, along with the general public also had distinct negative impacts on mental health outcomes.

=== Health disparities ===
There are clear disparities in the mental health outcomes for that of the trans and gender-diverse populations. However, disparities also arise in the provision of health services, along with experiences of general health outcomes.

There is a distinct underutilisation of a number of medical and clinical health services among transgender and gender diverse individuals. A small Western Australian study conducted in 2006 with 50 transgender and gender diverse adults reported significant underutilisation of cervical pap smears and mammograms (Gay, Lesbian, Bisexual, Transgender and Intersex Health and Wellbeing Ministerial Advisory Committee, 2014).

It was also discovered that whilst often utilising the services of general practitioners, trans and gender-diverse individuals had experienced a breadth of harassment and discrimination when accessing these health services (Riggs & Due, 2013). Feelings of having to educate practitioners on their own gender identify especially led to participants feeling less respected (Riggs & Due, 2013).

=== Gender-diverse Aboriginal and Torres Strait Islander people ===
Western terminology is often inadequate in discussions regarding the gender identity of Indigenous communities. In an Australian context, the terminology of "sistergirls" and "brotherboys" is used to describe gender-diverse Indigenous Australians. It has been proven that these aspects of Indigenous identity existed long before western colonialism (Toone 2015).

The organisation Sisters and Brothers NT also state that, "There is documented evidence and oral history of sistergirl identity in some communities pre-dating colonisation. A number of historic and contemporary words exist to describe sistergirls including "Kwarte Kwarte" in Arrernte, "Kungka Kungka" in Pitjantjatjara language and Luritja, "Yimpininni" in Tiwi, "Karnta Pia" in Warlpiri which can be interpreted as "like a girl", while "Kungka Wati" in {Pintupi and "Girriji Kati" in Warumungu literally mean "woman/man". (Toone 2015)

Due to this intersection as members of the LGBTQI community and Aboriginal and Torres Strait Islanders, the discrimination experienced by these individuals is at an extremely significant level, even when compared to the harassment experienced by other members of the transgender and gender diverse community (Kerry, 2015). These additional experiences of racism, even encountered within the LGBTQI community, along with facing transphobia within their traditional communities have led to distinct experiences of oppression unique to this community (Kerry, 2015).
