= Australian Young Greens =

Australian political party youth wing

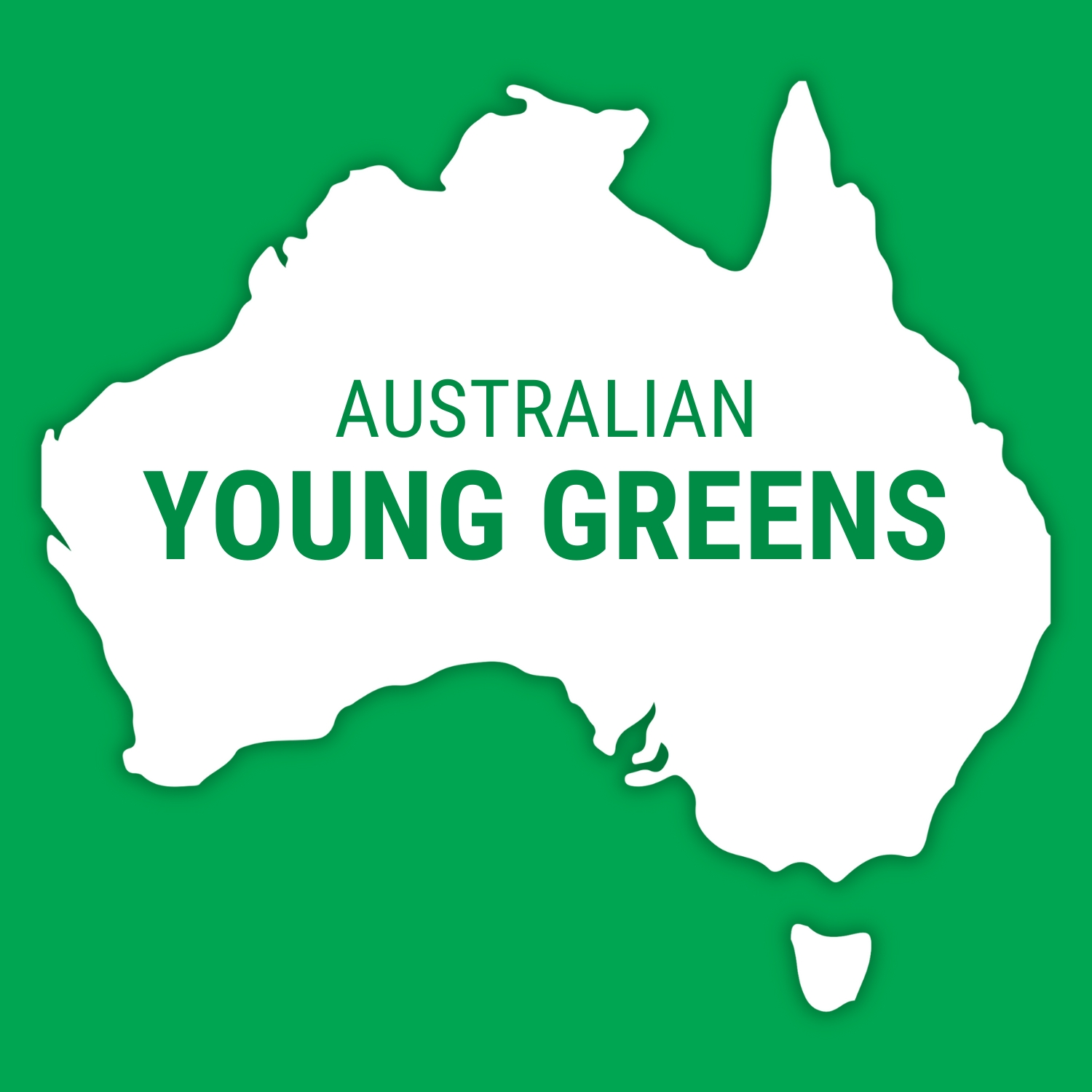
- Founded: 2011; 15 years ago
- Ideology: Green politics; Progressivism; Left-wing populism
- Position: Left-wing
- Mother party: Australian Greens
- International affiliation: Global Young Greens

The Australian Young Greens (commonly referred to as the Young Greens) is a federation of Young Greens groups from each Australian greens party. Collectively, they form the youth wing of the Australian Greens, representing members aged 31 and under. The Queensland Young Greens represent members aged 25 and under.

The group is underpinned by the four Greens pillars of ecological sustainability, social justice, grassroots democracy, and peace and non-violence.

Notable members of the Young Greens include Jordon Steele-John and Stephen Bates, two of the youngest members of the Australian Parliament when they were elected (aged 23 and 28 respectively).

== History ==
The Australian Young Greens and its related state and territory divisions have acted as a recruiting platform for the party and are often involved in activism on various youth-related issues. The group has been active in organising protests, including opposition to the Foetal Personhood Bill (Zoe's Law) in New South Wales in 2014 and the dredging of the Great Barrier Reef in Queensland in 2015. The Young Greens have also supported reducing the voting age to 16 and protested against federal funding cuts to Australian universities.

After Lee Rhiannon was removed from the federal Greens higher education portfolio in 2015, the NSW Young Greens released a statement opposing the decision, stating the group "believe[s] that members should have input into all decisions".

In 2025, the NSW Young Greens endorsed Mehreen Faruqi as federal party leader after the resignation of Adam Bandt, while the Australian Young Greens formally opposed Sarah Hanson-Young becoming leader but did not make an endorsement.

As of November 2025, the Australian Young Greens Facebook page has over 112,000 followers, its Instagram page has over 15,000 followers, and its TikTok page has over 27,000 followers.

== University groups ==
The Young Greens are active in most metropolitan and some regional Australian universities. They have student union representation at a number of these universities, with members of the Australian Young Greens having held the position of president at the University of Wollongong (2013–14), the University of Technology Sydney (2014), Murdoch University (2016), Edith Cowan University (2010, 2013, 2016, 2018), Flinders University (2018), and others.

=== List of current university groups ===
==== Australian Capital Territory ====
- Australian National University Greens
- University of Canberra Greens

==== New South Wales ====
- Macquarie University Greens
- University of New South Wales Greens
- Sydney University Greens Club
- University of Wollongong Young Greens
- Western Sydney University Greens on Campus

==== Queensland ====
- University of Queensland Greens
- Queensland University of Technology Greens
- Griffith University Greens

==== South Australia ====
- Adelaide University Greens Club
- Flinders University Greens

==== Victoria ====
- La Trobe Greens Club
- Monash University Greens Society
- UniMelb Greens Club

==== Western Australia ====
- Curtin University Greens Club
