= Class voting =

Relationship between social class and voting behavior

Class voting is the relationship between social class and voting behavior. The concept is central in political sociology, as political parties are seen by a large segment of scholars as representing social classes.

== Concept ==
The is a lack of clear consensus among scholars investigating class voting, with no agreed-upon definition or standardized measurement for class. In academia class is characterized as a contested concept due to this lack of scholarly agreement on its definition. The English sociologist Robert Alford took a binary approach to class, delineating two categories: the non-working class and the working class. Alford's influential work, "Party and Society: The Anglo-American Democracies," introduced the Alford Index for measuring class voting, currently the most widely utilized and critiqued index in the field. Additionally, Alford identified two voting categories: left-wing and right-wing votes.

== History ==
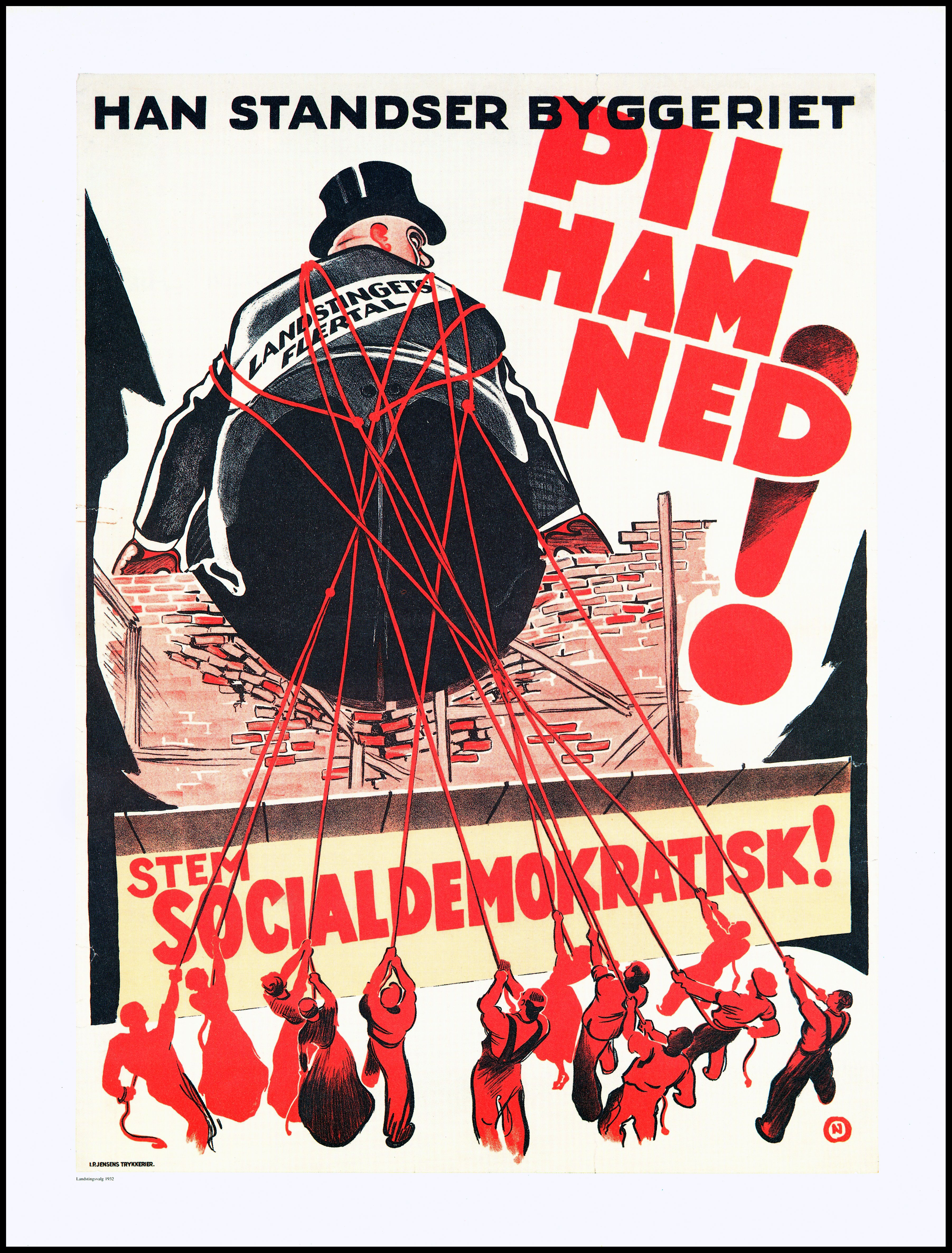
Election poster for the Danish Social Democrats which in 1932, which includes an appeal to working voters

Class voting as understood in a modern context started in the backdrop of the French Revolution and amidst escalating class tensions during the late 19th and early 20th centuries, social class emerged as a significant societal division that profoundly impacted electoral dynamics. This period witnessed a distinct pattern where laborers predominantly aligned with left-wing political parties, while the privileged middle class tended to support right-wing parties.

One of the most important works to scientifically research the question was the seminal work "The People’s Choice" (1944) by Lazarsfeld, Berelson, and Gaudet-Erskine. Now the is widely acknowledged as the foundational exploration of electoral sociology in the United States. In their investigation into the impact of social class on voting behavior during the 1940 presidential election, the researchers curated a representative panel and conducted seven rounds of comprehensive questioning. Their findings revealed a significant alignment between individuals' social and professional backgrounds and their voting preferences. Moreover, a noteworthy discovery was the limited deviation from initial choices among the majority of participants, suggesting minimal influence from electoral campaigns on vote selection.

The researchers identified three pivotal variables—economic and social status, religion, and place of residence—that played a crucial role in shaping political preferences. This led Lazarsfeld and his team to draw the conclusion that individuals tend to think politically in accordance with their social identity, asserting that social characteristics ultimately determine political traits.

== Traditional theories ==
=== Alford Index ===
One of the early theorists of class voting was Robert Alford, an English sociologist, conceptualized class in 1963 as a binary division, delineating two primary categories: the non-working class and the working class. Alford introduced a pivotal tool for quantifying class-based voting behavior, now widely recognized as the Alford Index which has drawn as drawn both acclaim and critique within scholarly discourse.

Alford also identified two distinct voting tendencies: a left-wing vote and a right-wing vote. The Alford Index operationalizes class voting by computing the disparity between the percentages of workers and non-workers casting ballots for left-wing candidates. In instances where all workers align with left-wing politics and none of the non-workers do so, the Alford Index achieves its maximum value of 100%, indicating a perfect class vote. Conversely, if the proportion of left-leaning voters among workers and non-workers is equal, the index yields a value of 0%, signifying the absence of a discernible class vote. The Alford Index, a significant measure in its time, has exerted a notable influence on subsequent approaches. Contemporary scholars often reference a classification system that was inspired by the Alford Index, which was developed by John Goldthorpe and Robert Erikson in 1992.

=== Sociological Model ===
The sociological model of class voting is defined as emphasizing bottom-up analysis the top-down approach, which looks to parties as the primary mechanism of class voting. In model has its origin in the book The People's Choice (1944), by Lazarsfeld, Berelson, and Gaudet-Erskine, the pivotal in the study of electoral sociology in the United States. Investigating the 1940 presidential election, the researchers found a significant link between individuals' social backgrounds and their voting preferences. They identified key factors—economic status, religion, and place of residence—that shape political views. Lazarsfeld and his team concluded that social characteristics drive political traits. This model remains influential to this day.

== Contemporary academic debates ==
=== Class dealignment ===
Dealignment in terms of class voting is understood as the reduction of the importance of class voting in favour of new cleavages, which have been called "post-materialist". In a period that class-based thinking in much of academia seemed prevalent, one of the first to discuss the idea of social class dealignment was Robert Nisbet, who in 1959 considered that because of current social developments during the period that he was writing, social class had become largely obsolete as a useful concept in social science, as status and values became more individualized. The concept is contested in academia, but at least starting at least from the 1980s some researchers increasingly were noticing a decline of class voting based on the traditional definitions in western countries, in contrast with the early post-WW2 period, leading to questions about "class voting dying out".

According to researcher Geoffrey Evans, summarizing much of the scholarly results, the decline could be explained by five explanations:

1. Social class has lost some or all of its importance as a determinant of life chances and in consequence its role as a source of divergent political interests.
2. New post-industrial social cleavages are replacing class-based conflict, with new identities such as gender, race and ethnicity becoming more prominent.
3. Cognitive mobilization leading to people being more issue oriented rather than class oriented in voting.
4. Post-material values led to a decline in the importance of class voting.
5. The manual working class has declined as a share of the electorate, so left-wing parties have adapted by changing their programme and class appeal.

=== Class realignment ===
A different strand of scholars, starting at least from the 1990s started arguing that rather than class voting losing importance, it is rather changing, thus "realignment", particularly in the West and the USA. Realignment researchers argued that even though classes were assumed to be less distinctive in their material conditions and value preference, yet that the distinctions have been transformed rather than removed, considering globalization as one of the main drivers of this realignment.

One 2021 research paper argues that class realignment consists of two main components. The first component is the changing behaviour of the working class. While the working class continues to form a substantial portion of the social-democratic vote, there has been a noticeable shift away from the left. This shift is characterized by a general decline in voter turnout among the working class in Western Europe and a significant educational voting gap. Many working-class voters have shifted their support to other mainstream parties, including those on the right, either directly or indirectly. The second component of class realignment focuses on the middle class. Within this group, there has been a notable shift among the highly educated middle class from the mainstream right to the left. In contrast, the managerial middle class continues to support mainstream right-wing parties. As the middle class has expanded, their voting behaviour has become increasingly fractured.

Another 2020 paper sees realignment in a western context driven by several factors: The increase in higher education, leading to graduates forming a new social class.Mass migration and the resulting reaction from socially conservative white voters. The growing proportion of older voters due to increased life expectancy. The development of cosmopolitan cities contrasted with conservative hinterlands.

In 2018 the concept of a "tripolar political space," was proposed suggesting that class voting has evolved into competition among three new political poles: the left, the center-right, and the radical right. Despite changes in class structures, voting behavior and competition remain influenced by class dynamics within these three political poles.

=== Post-Communism and other countries ===
The research also raises concerns about Western-centric and Eurocentric perspectives, as most studies focus on Western countries, calling into question the generalizability of these theories beyond the Western context. However, there have been efforts to understand the political dynamics of classes in post-Communist Eastern European countries. At east least some research has concluded that "divisions have emerged to some degree in each state according to its specific social composition, historical inheritance, and post-communist economic and political performance", indicating that class voting is also evident in post-communist nations.

== See also ==
- Voting
- Social class
- Cosmopolitan democracy
- Democratic mundialization
- Dollar voting
- Electoral fraud
- Electoral system
- Gerrymandering
- Mandate (politics)
- Opinion poll
- Political base
- Presidential election
- Proportional representation
- Psephology
- Ranked voting systems
- Redistricting
- Referendum
- Right of expatriates to vote in their country of origin
- Suffrage
- Right to candidacy
- Vote splitting
- Voter turnout
- Voting bloc
- Voting methods in deliberative assemblies
- Voting system
