= Israel Tisdale Talbot =

American physician (1829–1899)

- Born: October 29, 1829; Sharon, Massachusetts, U.S.
- Died: July 2, 1899 (aged 69); Hingham, Boston, Massachusetts (now Hingham, Massachusetts), U.S.
- Other names: I. Tisdale Talbot, Israel Talbot, I. T. Talbot
- Occupations: Homeopathic physician, professor of surgery, dean, medical school founder
- Spouse: Emily Fairbanks Talbot
- Children: 6 (4 who survived their parents, including Marion Talbot)

Israel Tisdale Talbot (October 29, 1829 – July 2, 1899) was an American physician and an early practitioner of homeopathic medicine in New England. He was instrumental in the foundation of the Medical Department of Boston University, which provided direction when Boston University merged with the New England Female Medical College to form the Boston University School of Medicine (now Chobanian & Avedisian School of Medicine).

Talbot was director of the Boston homeopathic hospital and served as a professor of surgery and dean of the Boston University School of Medicine from 1873 until the year of his death. Talbot founded the New England Medical Gazette and was the president of the American Institute of Homeopathy (AIH) in 1872. His wife, Emily, was his co-worker, particularly involved in homeopathic medicine and founding and sitting on the board of trustees of the Westborough Insane Hospital. She co-founded the organization that became the American Association of University Women.

== Early life ==
Israel Tisdale Talbot was born on October 29, 1829 in Sharon, Massachusetts. He was the son of Mary Richards and Josiah Talbot. He attended Worcester Academy in 1850. He was a Harvard University graduate.

His sister, Nancy Talbot Clark, studied medicine at Case Western Reserve University School of Medicine, graduating by 1853, (Note: Talbot wrote of his sister's graduate, which he attended, "Today the diploma of the College was conferred upon her, an honor which she has faithfully earned, for she has been a faithful student, and I am told by the Professors that she stands One of the first, if not the very first in medical knowledge in a class of more than fifty graduates. She has won the esteem and respect of all the Professors and students, and many have been the tokens of respect bestowed.") but denied membership in the Massachusetts Medical Society, which was not supportive of women or homeopaths until the 1870s.

== Medicine ==
Talbot, interested in learning homeopathic medicine, studied under Samuel Gregg, the first physician to practice homeopathic medicine in New England. In 1853, he graduated from the Homeopathic Medical College in Philadelphia, Pennsylvania. On June 5, 1855, Talbot performed the first successful tracheotomy in the United States.

Talbot was a member of the Massachusetts Medical Society (MMS) and he established a medical practice with many of Boston's elite society (Boston Brahmin). One of his patients was Isaac Rich, a founder of Boston University. The Medical Society ousted eight prominent homeopaths called the "irregulars", including Talbot, as the physicians sought to establish a homeopathic medical college with Boston University. The press sided with the homeopaths from 1871 to 1873. In 1870 and 1872, a group of Bostonian women held fairs to establish the Massachusetts Homoeopathic Hospital, which received further support as support grew for the Homeopaths. The hospital's Ladies Aid Association was established and grew quickly. Since women — like Julia Ward Howe, Louisa May Alcott, and Elizabeth Stuart Phelps — were a driving force in the funding, they asked for women to attend the new homeopathic college. Talbot supported coeducation, and with Professor De Gersedorff, welcomed Francis Janney, the first female student at the medical school in 1874. She found the faculty supportive, assuming that women would do as well as the men. Talbot and David Thayer supported accepting women as members of the Massachusetts Homeopathic Society, which was established in 1874. Talbot was considered one of the most prominent homeopaths in Boston.

Talbot was one of the founders of the New England Medical Gazette in 1866, and served as editor of the publication from 1866–1872. He was director of the Massachusetts or Boston Homeopathic Hospital. Talbot was a founder, professor of surgery, and dean of the Boston University School of Medicine from its formation in 1873 until the year of his death. He was the president of the American Institute of Homeopathy (AIH) in 1872.

Talbot's wife, Emily Fairbanks Talbot, is described as his co-worker, "not just assisting her husband". Emily was particularly involved in homeopathic medical care and serving the Westborough Insane Hospital by sitting on the Board of Trustees, which they co-founded.

In 1893, he wrote Medical Education in the Homoeopathic Hospitals and Colleges of the United States of transactions of the World's Homoeopathic Congress.

He was the vice president and trustee of the Homeopathic Society of Massachusetts. Talbot is an honorary member of twelve state medical societies and an honorary member of the National Homeopathic Society in Great Britain and France.

== Marriage and children ==
Talbot married Emily Fairbanks Talbot in 1856.

They had six children, four of whom survived their parents:

- Marion Talbot, born in Thun, Switzerland, who was a trustee of Boston University and was then dean of women at Chicago University.
- Edith Talbot, married to Dr. William Leavitt Jackson, of Roxbury, Boston, Massachusetts
- Agnes Woodman Talbot, died in her first year
- Emily Talbot, died in her first year
- Dr. Winthrop Tisdale (W. T.) Talbot
- Rev. Henry Russell (H. R.) Talbot of St. Stephen's Mission Church in Boston, Massachusetts

== Death ==
Talbot died at his home in Hingham, Massachusetts on July 2, 1899, and was buried at Mount Auburn Cemetery. After her husband's death, Emily's health began to fail. She died in Holderness, New Hampshire at her summer home on October 29, 1900. Talbot and her daughter are also interred at Mount Auburn Cemetery.

== Bibliography ==
- Kirschmann, Anne Taylor (2004). A vital force : women in American homeopathy. New Brunswick, New Jersey: Rutgers University Press. ISBN 978-0-8135-3320-9.
