= Ellen Swallow Richards House =

Historic house in Massachusetts, United States

- Ellen Swallow Richards Residence
- U.S. National Register of Historic Places
- U.S. National Historic Landmark
- U.S. Historic district – Contributing property
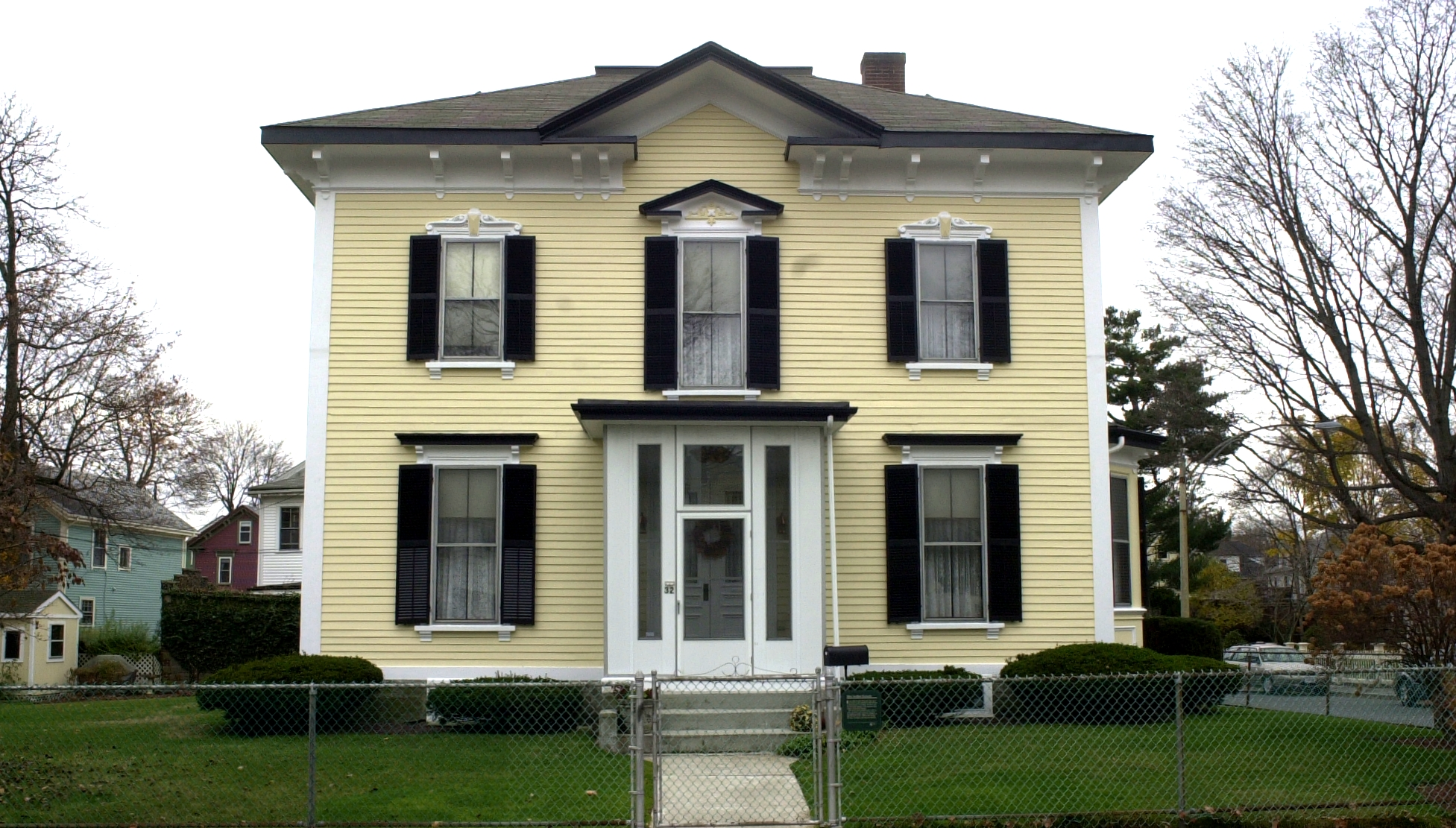
- Main facade

- Location within Massachusetts Location within the United States
- Location: 32 Eliot St., Jamaica Plain, Massachusetts
- Coordinates: 42°18′41.5″N 71°7′3.5″W
- Area: 0.2 acres (0.081 ha)
- Architectural style: Italianate
- Part of: Monument Square Historic District (ID90001536)
- NRHP reference No.: 92001874

Significant dates
- Added to NRHP: March 31, 1992
- Designated CP: October 11, 1990

The Ellen H. Swallow Richards House is a National Historic Landmark house at 32 Eliot Street in Jamaica Plain, a neighborhood of Boston, Massachusetts. It was the home of Ellen Swallow Richards (1842–1911) from 1876 (shortly after her marriage to Robert Hallowell Richards) until her death. Richards was the first woman to graduate from the Massachusetts Institute of Technology, and was its first female instructor. She introduced revolutionary ideas about home sanitation, and conducted pioneering work (some of it in this house) that led to the establishment of the field of home economics. The house itself was regularly altered as a consequence of her research, and was used by Richards as a consumer product testing laboratory. It was designated a National Historic Landmark in 1992.

== Description ==
The Richards house is, from its exterior, a fairly typical two story Italianate house. It stands at the corner of Eliot and Dane Streets on a generously sized lot. The house is three bays wide and two deep, with an ell extending along most of the width of its rear. It is clad in clapboards, and has a low-pitched hip roof with a small gable above the main entrance, and a hip-roof dormer in the rear. The eaves are decorated with sawn brackets. The windows on the street-facing facades are treated with decorated surrounds, and there are projecting polygonal bays on the side facades.

The interior of the house, in particular the kitchen in the rear ell, was extensively modified by the Richardses after they moved in during 1876. The most significant changes affected the plumbing and air circulation within the house. The house water was supplied by a well, and Richards ensured that the drainage around the house would not direct wastewater toward it. Pipes in the house were regularly modernized, including the introduction of traps to prevent mixing of fresh and waste water. Lead pipes were replaced because of the known risk of lead poisoning.

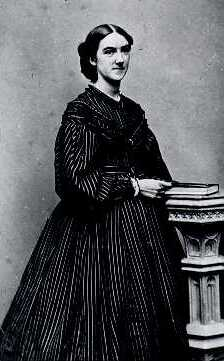
Ellen Swallow Richards, c. 1864

Prior to the introduction of electricity to the area, the house was lit by gas and heated by coal. To reduce health concerns caused by fumes from these sources, Richards made modifications to improve air circulation. Windows were replaced with ones that could open either upward or downward, so that warmer (polluted) air might escape through the upper opening. Holes were cut in walls an ceilings above lights and heating fixtures to facilitate the removal of combustion byproducts. A master vent was installed at the attic level, and a mechanical ventilation system was installed. A range hood was installed over the stove in the kitchen. As soon as electricity was available in the neighborhood, the Richardses had the house electrified, removing many sources of combustion. They were also among the first in the area to have a telephone.

Richards used her own domestic processes to perform experiments and improve efficiency. The gas meter in the house was placed in the kitchen, where she could observe consumption with different cooking methods. All manner of home gadgetry was subjected to testing, either by Richards or by students who boarded with the family, testing for efficiency and effectiveness for intended tasks. These experiments, in conjunction with laboratory work performed while she worked at MIT's Sanitary Chemistry Laboratory, led to the discipline now known as home economics. Her other work at that lab led to improvements in areas as diverse as wastewater engineering and the proper ventilation of industrial spaces to avoid fires.

The Richards house was designated a National Historic Landmark and listed on the National Register of Historic Places in 1992, in recognition for Ellen Swallow Richards' many accomplishments. The house is also a contributing resources to the Monument Square Historic District.

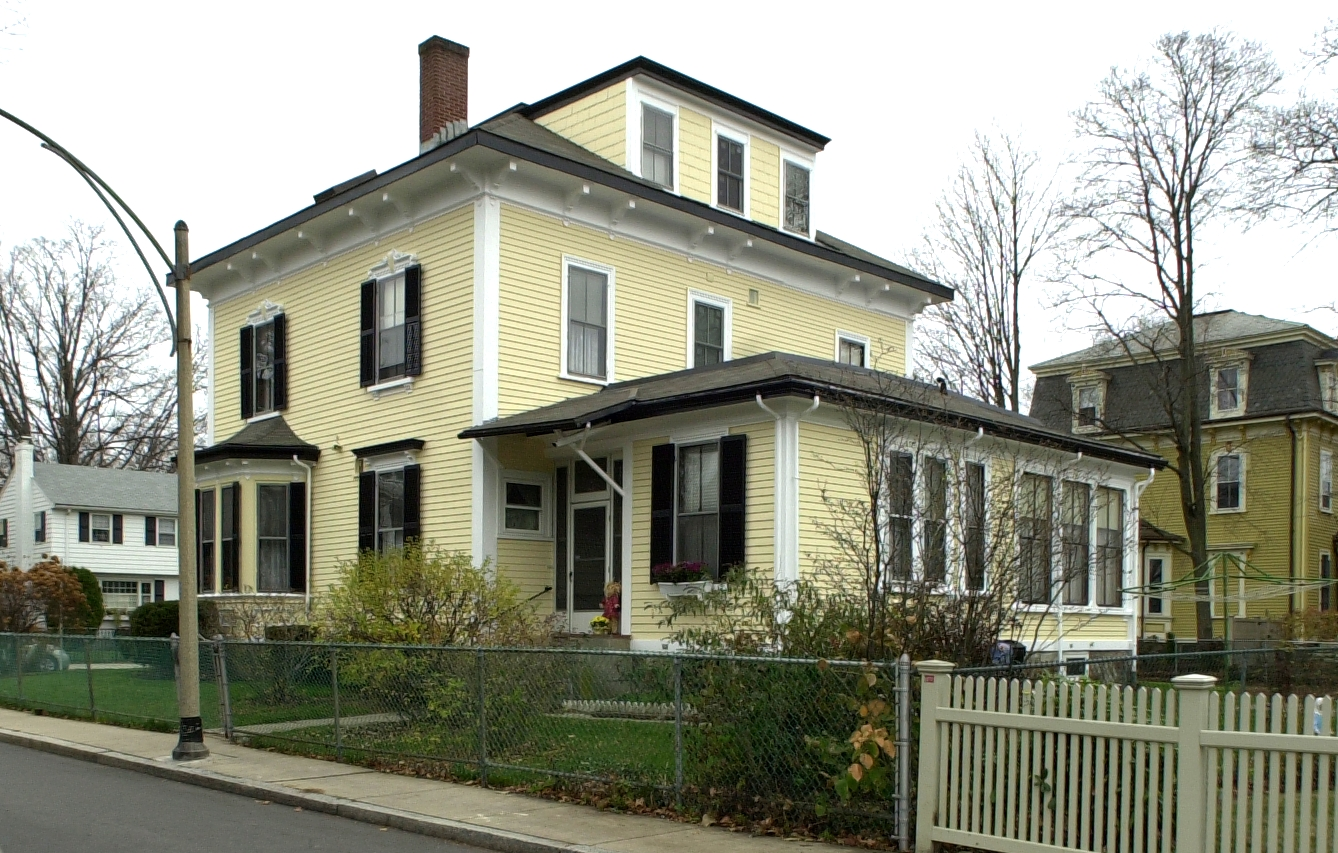
View of rear

== See also ==
- List of National Historic Landmarks in Boston
- National Register of Historic Places listings in southern Boston, Massachusetts
