= Emily Talbot =

Emily Talbot may refer to:

- Emily Charlotte Talbot (1840–1918), Welsh heiress and industrialist of South Wales
- Emily Fairbanks Talbot (1834–1900), American philanthropist of Boston, Massachusetts
