= Francis A. Mallison =

American journalist and editor

Francis Avery Mallison
- Born: March 13, 1832; Rome, New York, United States
- Died: June 22, 1877 (aged 45); Brooklyn, New York, United States
- Other name: Francis O'Pake
- Occupation: Journalist
- Known for: Longtime reporter for the Brooklyn Eagle; he and editor Joseph Howard, Jr. organized the "Great Civil War Gold Hoax"
- Political party: Democrat

Francis Avery Mallison (March 13, 1832 – June 22, 1877) was an American journalist, editor and public servant. A longtime reporter for the Brooklyn Eagle, known under his pen name Francis O'Pake, he and then city editor Joseph Howard, Jr. were responsible for publishing a forged document to manipulate the price of gold on the New York Stock Exchange resulting in the "Great Civil War Gold Hoax".

== Early life ==
Francis Mallison was born in Rome, New York to a Methodist family from Connecticut. His father was a local schoolteacher. He attended the Oneida Conference Seminary, the Polytechnic School at Chittenango and the Seminary at Lowville. Mallison received common school training and began contributing to the Rome Sentinel shortly after leaving school. Mallison also traveled to the western United States in 1849 and the southern United States in 1851–1852, studying the culture and economic issues in these areas. He also worked as a telegraph operator in Central New York.

== Editing ==
He eventually gained editorial control of the Rome Sentinel and remained editor until he moved to Brooklyn in November 1859, whereupon he took a position at the City News. He became acquainted with many prominent New Yorkers while on the paper and, upon its reorganization, joined the Brooklyn Eagle. Mallison eventually became city editor of the Brooklyn Eagle himself, but was forced to retire due to poor health. However, his position gained him valuable political connections and he was admitted to the bar in December 1866. He was a member of the New York State Assembly (Kings Co., 4th D.) in 1868. He remained in journalism as a political correspondent while a member of the Legislature and resumed it on a full-time basis after the end of his term. In 1870, he was appointed Deputy Clerk of the Brooklyn City Court and held the position until September 1875.

== Controversy ==
While Mallison was with the Brooklyn Eagle, he and city editor Joseph Howard, Jr. conspired to forge a document, under the guise of an Associated Press dispatch, which claimed that President Abraham Lincoln was calling for 400,000 men to be conscripted into the Union Army. The news of the draft caused the stock market to crash, while the price of gold went up. Mallison and Howard made a large profit, but detectives managed to track down Mallison two days after the document had been published. He implicated Howard in the deception, and the two were arrested. Mallison was held as a prisoner of war at Fort Lafayette for six months before his release on September 23, 1864.

== Retirement and death ==
Retiring to private life, he traveled to South America for his health and remained abroad for four months. Upon his return, he lived at his Myrtle Avenue home until his death from jaundice on the morning of June 22, 1877.

New York State Assembly
Preceded by Caleb F. Buckley	New York State Assembly; Kings County, 5th District; 1867	Succeeded by James R. Allaben
