= Manton Marble =

Manton Marble (1835–1917) was a New York journalist. He was the proprietor and editor of the New York World from 1862 to 1876.

== Early life ==
Marble was born in Worcester, Massachusetts on November 16, 1835. He graduated from the University of Rochester in 1855, at age 20. He joined the Boston Journal and also became editor of the Traveller. He moved to New York City in 1858 and joined the New York Evening Post. In 1859, he went to the Red River Valley in the Midwest as The Evening Post's correspondent. He contributed three papers on his journey to Harper's Magazine.

== New York World ==
The New York World was founded in 1860. Marble became its proprietor and editor in 1862. He turned it into a free-trade Democratic newspaper. Marble's World building was not attacked during the New York City Draft Riots of 1863, unlike the Republican newspapers The Tribune and The Times.

In 1864, the World was charged with fraud after it published communications from President Lincoln that turned out to be forged. Lincoln arrested Marble and placed the World under military guard. Marble, and the World, was allowed to resume publication three days later. In 1872, the World vigorously opposed Horace Greeley's presidential campaign. Marble retired from his editorial position in 1876.

In 1885, he went to Europe as a delegate to the Bi-Metallic Congress. He became president of the Manhattan Club in 1888. Marble died in England on July 24, 1917, at the age of 82.

== Publications ==
- Marble, Manton. A Secret Chapter of Political History. The Electoral Commission. The Truth Concerning Samuel J. Tilden, President, De Jure, Disclosed and Stated against Some False Representations of His Action, Advice and Conduct During the Winter of 1876-7. 1878.
- Marble, Manton. Fraser River. New York: Dexter & Brother and Ross & Tousey, 1858.
- Mercer, Alexander G., and Manton Marble. Bible Characters, Being Selections from Sermons of Alexander Gardiner Mercer, D.D. (1817–1882). New York: G.P. Putnam's Sons, 1885.
- Marble, Manton, and Abraham Lincoln. Letter to Abraham Lincoln. New York: Priv. Print, 1867.
- Marble, Manton. To Red River & Beyond. S.l: s.n, 1860.
- Marble, Manton. Freedom of the Press Wantonly Violated: Letter of Mr. Marble to President Lincoln, Reappearance of the Journal of Commerce, Opinions of the Press on This Outrage. New York: s.n, 1864.
- Marble, Manton, and Abraham Lincoln. The Papers of Manton Marble. Washington, D.C.: Library of Congress, 1852.
- Marble, Manton. The Ancient and Modern Idea of a State. 1855.

== See also ==
- New York World
- Samuel Tilden
- New York Draft Riots
- Horace Greeley
