= Civil War gold hoax =

1864 unsuccessful financial hoax

The Civil War Gold Hoax, also known as the Bogus Proclamation of 1864, was an 1864 unsuccessful financial hoax perpetrated during the American Civil War by American journalists Joseph Howard Jr. and Francis Mallison of the Brooklyn Eagle. Howard and Mallson hoped to exploit uncertainty about the ongoing war and trigger a sudden financial panic and profit from it. The conspirators bought gold on margin and then attempted to circulate a false proclamation from President Abraham Lincoln among New York newspapers, that called for a national day of prayer and the conscription of 400,000 additional men into the Union army. Howard and Mallison hoped that this proclamation would lead investors to believe that the Lincoln administration thought the war was going poorly, and cause them to abandon the Union greenback currency and instead buy gold, driving up its price. With the price of gold artificially inflated, the conspirators could sell high and make a considerable amount of money, before anyone realized the proclamation was a forgery.

Misunderstanding the hoax as an intelligence leak, Lincoln and Secretary of War Edwin Stanton ordered two newspapers to be closed and numerous reporters and telegraph personnel arrested. Military authorities in New York City quickly discovered the fraudulent nature of the proclamation and arrested both fraudsters within days of the attempted hoax. The reporters and telegraph personnel were soon released while Howard remained in jail until August, and Mallison until September. While they were imprisoned Lincoln released a similar proclamation to Howard and Mallison's fraudulent one, which called for 500,000 new volunteers for the Union army.

== Hoax ==
During the evening of May 17 a young accomplice of Howard and Mallsion delivered forged Associated Press dispatches announcing the proclamation to several New York City newspapers. The purpose of the late-night drop off was to get the proclamation printed as a breaking story that night editors would be eager to insert into the next day's paper, but would have little time to check its validity. The delivery boy failed to drop off the notice at the offices of the New York Tribune however, and when employees at the New York Times and New York Daily News discovered this they became suspicious and opted not to publish it. The New York Herald published it at first, but when the editor there realized that neither of the other two major papers, the Times and Tribune, had published it, they became suspicious and pulled the proclamation from its pages, destroying thousands of copies which carried the fake document. As a result, only two newspapers, the Journal of Commerce and the New York World, printed the proclamation in their morning editions on May 18, 1864.

When editors at the Journal and World realized on the morning of May 18 that no other papers had published the announcement from the president, they realized they had been fooled and began to recall their papers. The financial nature of the hoax was soon uncovered by General John Dix, and Secretary of State William Seward issued an announcement that afternoon denouncing the proclamation as a fake. Howard and Mallison were eventually arrested on May 21. Howard remained imprisoned until August 23, when Lincoln ordered he be released at the behest of Howard's family friend Henry Ward Beecher. Mallison remained in jail another month, until Lincoln ordered him released on September 20 after Mallison wrote him an appeal expressing "sincere regret at my folly."

In the immediate wake of the publication of the proclamation on May 18, the Lincoln administration reacted with uncharacteristically harsh measures. The president ordered General Dix to arrest Manton Marble and William Prime, editors of the World and Journal respectively, and to occupy their newspaper offices with federal troops. Lincoln and Secretary of War Edwin Stanton went on to order the arrest of the New York staff of the Independent Telegraph Company, and closed the company offices in Baltimore, Harrisburg, Pittsburgh, and Philadelphia. The Washington company offices were also closed and searched, and the superintendent was interrogated and imprisoned. The next day Stanton also had several journalists in Washington arrested: Henry Villard, Adams Sherman Hill, and Horace White. Marble and Prime were released on May 21, and their papers resumed publishing on May 23. The telegraph closings were also rescinded after several days, and the telegraph staff, along with the unfortunate Washington reporters were released.

The cause of the harsh measures the Lincoln administration took in the wake of the hoax appears to be that Lincoln and Stanton believed that the proclamation was the result of a major security breach. By complete coincidence, at the same time Howard and Mallison were concocting a false proclamation calling for 400,000 new soldiers, Lincoln was drafting a genuine proclamation that would also call for hundreds of thousands of new soldiers. Upon hearing of the fake proclamation Lincoln and some of his cabinet thought it suspiciously similar to the unannounced proclamation they were considering and concluded someone had leaked it to the opposition press (the World and Journal were notorious critics of Lincoln). The widespread arrests among journalists, telegraph operators, and newspaper publishers were therefore an attempt to catch whoever had leaked the President's announcement, and were released once Lincoln and his cabinet were satisfied there had been no such leak. Lincoln eventually released his genuine proclamation calling for 500,000 new volunteers for the army on July 18.
