= Nancy Talbot Clark =

American physician (1825–1901)

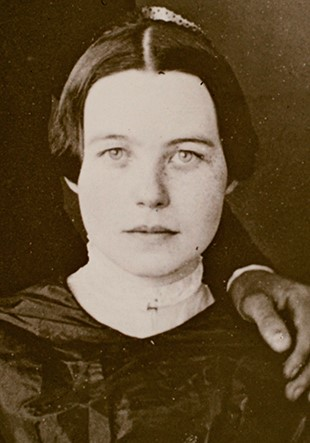
- Born: May 22, 1825; Sharon, Massachusetts
- Died: July 28, 1901 (aged 76); Haverford Township, Delaware County, Pennsylvania
- Education: Case Western Reserve University
- Known for: Second woman in the United States to graduate medical school
- Medical career
- Profession: Physician

Nancy Elizabeth Talbot Clark Binney (May 22, 1825 – July 28, 1901) was the second woman to earn a medical degree in the United States from a recognized (non-sectarian or allopathic) medical institution after Elizabeth Blackwell, graduating in 1852, and the first woman to earn a medical degree from Case Western Reserve University Medical School, then known as the Cleveland Medical College of the Western Reserve College.

== Biography ==
Nancy was born on May 22, 1825, in Sharon, Massachusetts to Joasiah Talbot and Mary Richards Talbot as the seventh child of five boys and five girls. Her brother was the homeopath Israel Tinsdale Talbot.

In 1845, she married dentist Champion Clark, then bore a daughter who died within a year. Her husband succumbed to typhoid fever dying in March 1848. She found her way to Cleveland, Ohio where under the leadership of Dean Delamater, she became the first female graduate of the Cleveland Medical College (now Case Western Reserve University School of Medicine), in 1852.

Israel Tinsdale Talbot wrote of his sister's graduation, which he attended,

Today the diploma of the College was conferred upon her, an honor which she has faithfully earned, for she has been a faithful student, and I am told by the Professors that she stands One of the first, if not the very first in medical knowledge in a class of more than fifty graduates. She has won the esteem and respect of all the Professors and students, and many have been the tokens of respect bestowed."

Clark returned to Massachusetts, where she practiced medicine in Boston from April 1852 to August 1854 but stopped after she was unsuccessful in gaining admission to the Massachusetts Medical Society due to being a woman. In 1856, she married Amos Binney of Boston and had six children. After raising the family, she returned to medicine in 1874 opening a free dispensary for women in Boston.

Nancy died in 1901 and was buried at Mount Auburn Cemetery in Cambridge, Massachusetts.
