= Ellen Swallow Richards =

American engineer and chemist (1843–1911)

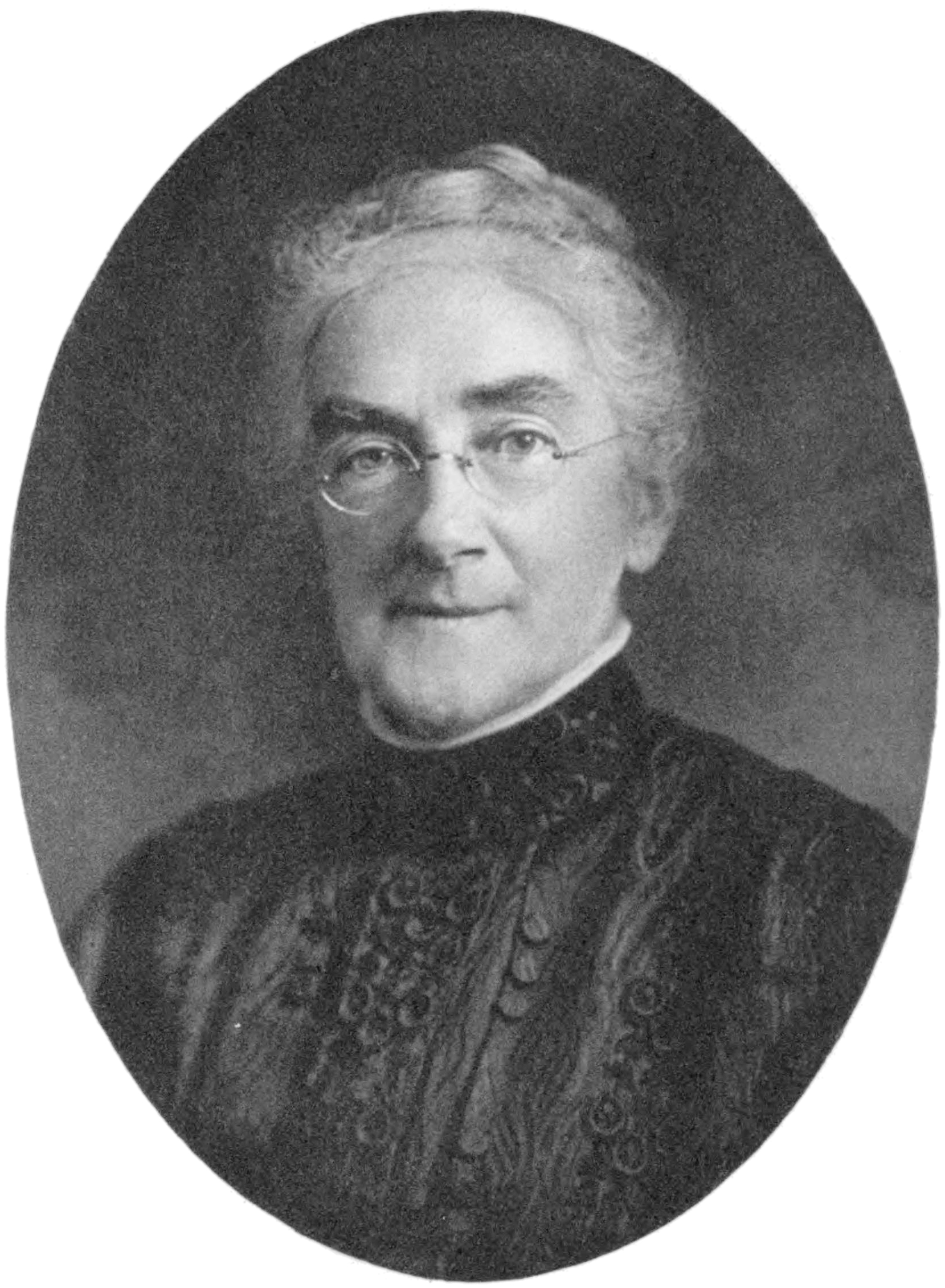
- Richards c. 1890s From The Life of Ellen H. Richards by Caroline L. Hunt, 1912
- Born: December 3, 1842; Dunstable, Massachusetts, U.S.
- Died: March 30, 1911 (aged 68); Boston, Massachusetts, U.S.
- Resting place: Christ Church Cemetery, Gardiner, Maine, U.S.
- Education: Vassar College; Massachusetts Institute of Technology
- Occupations: Chemist; professor
- Known for: Home economics Euthenics; School meals
- Spouse: Robert Hallowell Richards (m. 1875)

Ellen Henrietta Swallow Richards (née Swallow; December 3, 1842 – March 30, 1911) was an American industrial and safety engineer, environmental chemist, and university faculty member in the United States during the 19th century. Her pioneering work in sanitary engineering, and experimental research in domestic science, laid a foundation for the new science of home economics. She was the founder of the home economics movement characterized by the application of science to the home, and the first to apply chemistry to the study of nutrition.

Richards graduated from Westford Academy in 1862. She was the first woman admitted to the Massachusetts Institute of Technology. She graduated in 1873 and later became its first female instructor. Richards was the first woman in America accepted to any school of science and technology, and the first American woman to obtain a degree in chemistry, which she earned from Vassar College in 1870.

Richards was a pragmatic feminist, as well as a founding ecofeminist, who believed that women's work within the home was a vital aspect of the economy. She made strides forward in the area of women's education, specifically in developing laboratory skills. At the same time, she did not directly challenge women's place and work in the home, instead emphasizing the need for their involvement in domestic sciences. Through her work she created multiple organizations and published many articles, writing over 100 publications during her lifetime.

== Biography ==
=== Early childhood ===
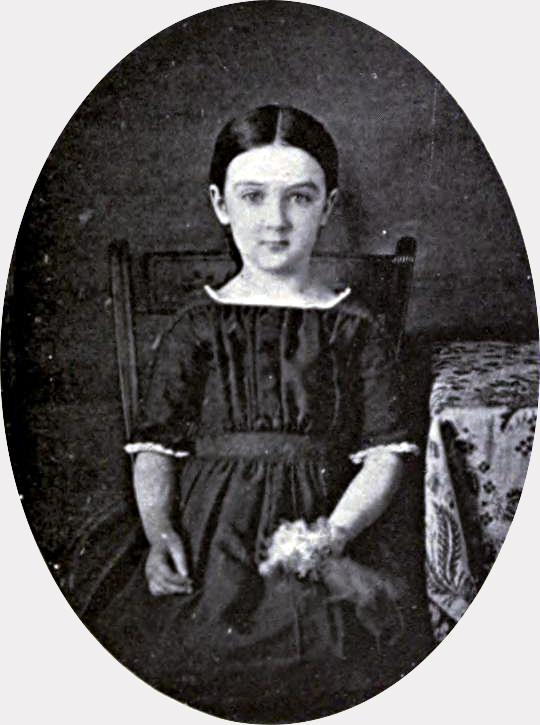
Daguerreotype of Ellen Henrietta Swallow, c. 1848

Richards was born in Dunstable, Massachusetts. She was the only child of Peter Swallow (b. June 27, 1813, Dunstable; d. March 1871, Littleton, Massachusetts) and Fanny Gould Taylor (b. April 9, 1817, New Ipswich, New Hampshire), both of whom came from established families of modest means and were believers in the value of education.

=== Early life and education ===
Swallow was home-schooled in her early years. She was prone to sickness, so her parents felt that home-schooling her would keep her healthy, since the local school often had children suffering from diseases. In 1859, the family moved to Westford, and she attended Westford Academy. This was one of the few co-educational secondary schools in the nation at the time. Peter Swallow sold the family's farm and moved to the town just so she could attend the school. Studies at the academy included mathematics, composition, and Latin, similar to other New England academies of the time. Swallow's Latin proficiency allowed her to study French and German, a rare language north of New York. Due to her language skills she was much in demand as a tutor, and the income earned from this made it possible for Swallow to further her studies.

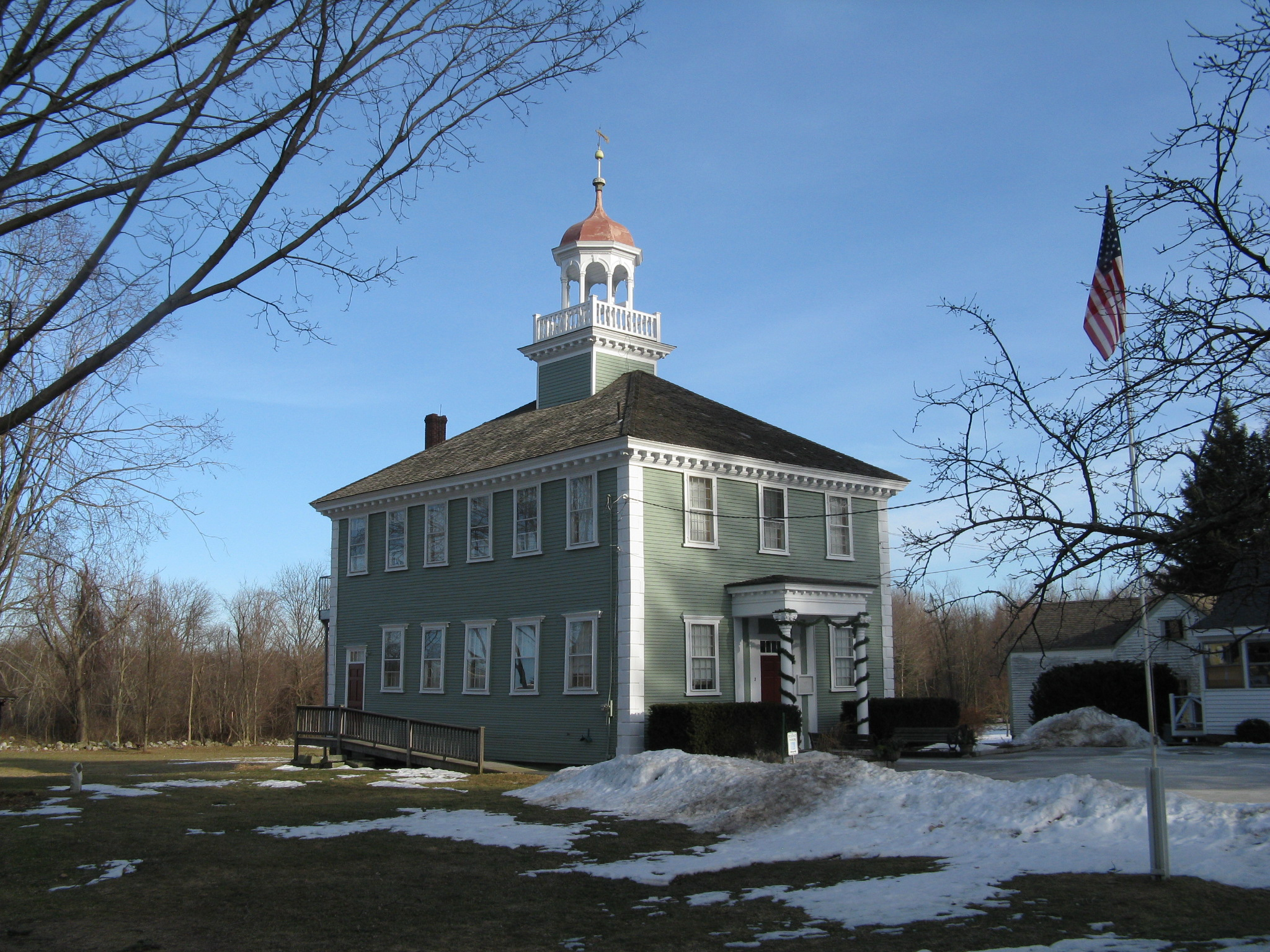
Old Westford Academy

In March 1862, she left the academy. Two months later, in May, she developed the measles, which set her back physically and interrupted her preparations to begin teaching.

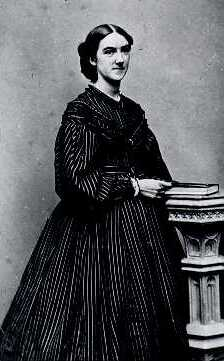
Miss Ellen Henrietta Swallow, c. 1864

In the spring of 1863, the family moved to Littleton, Massachusetts, where Mr. Swallow had just purchased a larger store and expanded his business. In June 1864, Swallow, now twenty-one, took a teaching position.

In 1865 she spent that year tending the family store and taking care of her ill mother instead of teaching. During the winter of 1865–66, Swallow studied and attended lectures in Worcester.

=== College education ===
In September 1868, Swallow entered Vassar College, classified as a special student. She saved up the $300 for a year's tuition doing various jobs. After taking the entrance exam, she placed in as a junior, even though she was only formally educated for two years. Somewhat over a year later, she was admitted to the senior class, graduating in 1870 with a bachelor's degree. She then earned a Master of Arts degree with a thesis on the chemical analysis of iron ore. The strongest personal influences during her college years were Maria Mitchell, the astronomer, and Professor Charles S. Farrar (1826-1908), who was at the head of the Department of Natural Sciences and Mathematics. Farrar was the one who encouraged her to pursue chemistry as he agreed with Swallow that it should be used to solve practical problems.

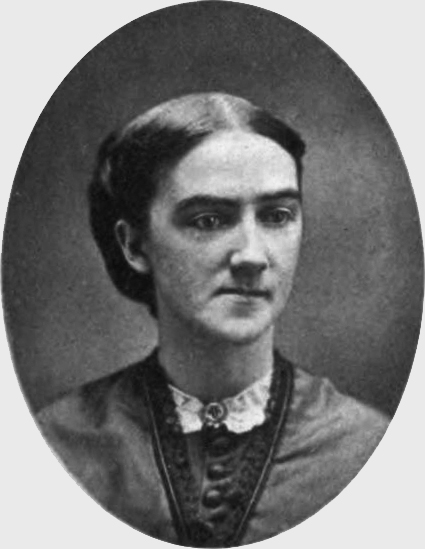
Miss Ellen Henrietta Swallow, Vassar Class Picture, 1870

Signature from 1873 MIT thesis

In 1870, she wrote to Merrick and Gray, commercial chemists in Boston, asking if they would take her on as an apprentice. They replied that they were not in a position to take pupils and that her best course was to try to enter Boston Tech, or as it is now known, the Massachusetts Institute of Technology (MIT) as a student. On December 10, 1870, after some discussion and a vote, the Faculty of the Institute of Technology recommended to the MIT Corporation the admission of Swallow as a special student in chemistry. Swallow thus became the first woman admitted to MIT, although the institution made it clear that "her admission did not establish a precedent for the general admission of females," according to the records of the university's meeting on December 14, 1870. Since she was admitted as a "special student" she did not have to pay tuition, and so the university had to keep no record of her attendance. Through her studies there she faced a lot of segregation with the faculty worried that her presence might alarm the male students. In 1873, Swallow received a Bachelor of Science degree from MIT for her thesis, "Notes on Some Sulpharsenites and Sulphantimonites from Colorado". She continued her studies at MIT and would have been awarded its first advanced degree, but MIT balked at granting this distinction to a woman and did not award its first advanced degree, a Master of Science in chemistry, until 1886.

Richards served on the board of trustees of Vassar College for many years and was granted an honorary doctor of science degree in 1910.

=== Marriage and home ===
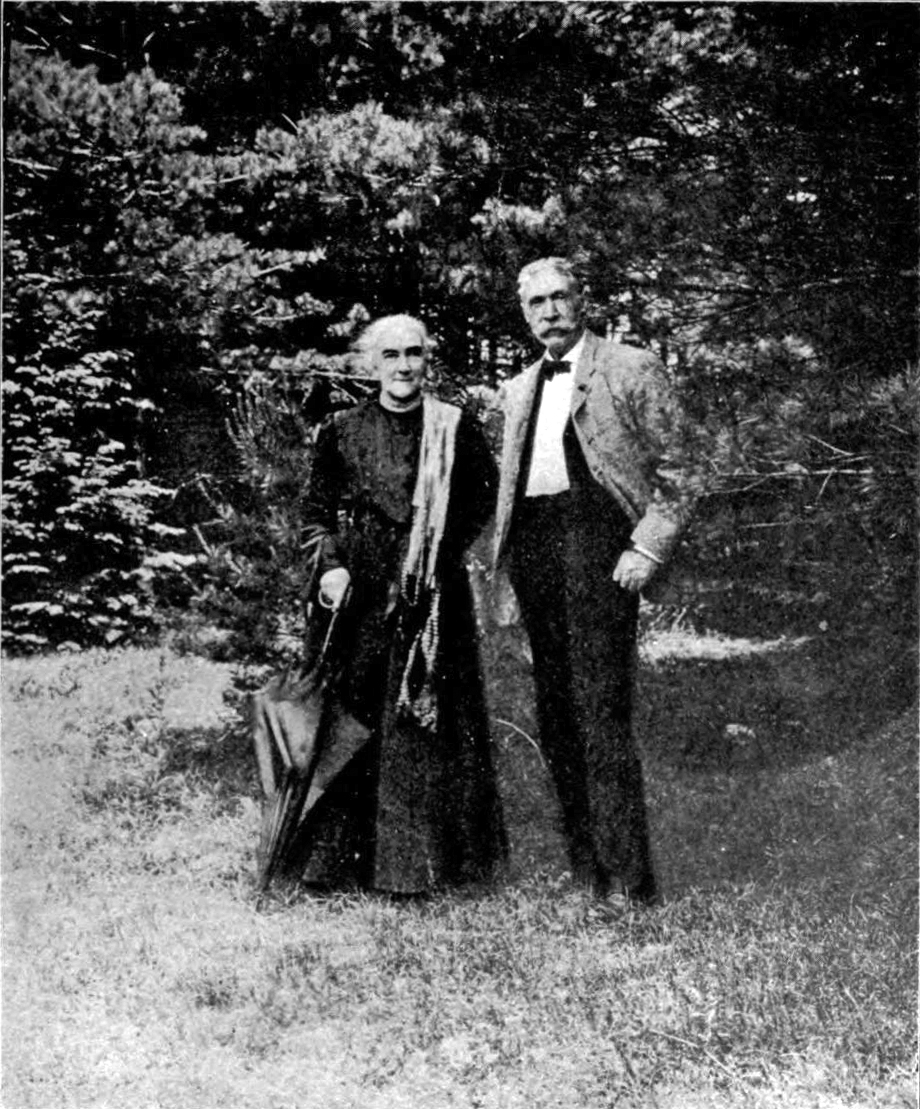
Robert and Ellen Richards, 1904

On June 4, 1875, Swallow married Robert Hallowell Richards (1844–1945), chairman of the Mine Engineering Department at MIT, with whom she had worked in the mineralogy laboratory. They took up residence in Jamaica Plain, Massachusetts. With her husband's support she remained associated with MIT, volunteering her services and contributing $1,000 annually to the "Woman's Laboratory." A program in which her students were mostly schoolteachers, whose training had lacked laboratory work, and who wanted to perform chemical experiments and learn mineralogy.

== Career ==
Her first post-college career was as an unpaid chemistry lecturer at MIT from 1873 to 1878.

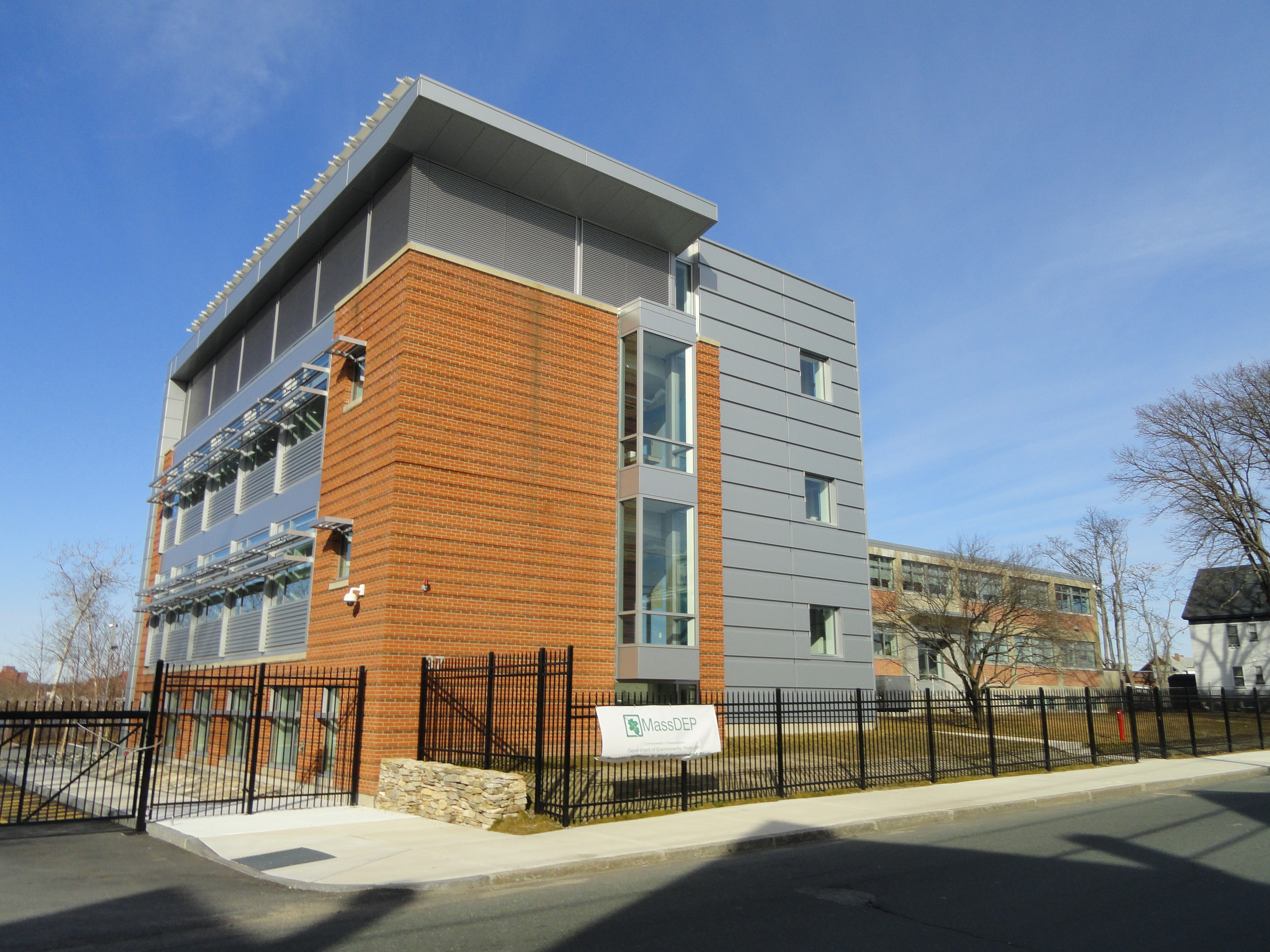
2011 addition to the Lawrence Experiment Station

From 1884 until her death, Swallow now Richards was an instructor at the newly founded laboratory of sanitary chemistry at the Lawrence Experiment Station, the first in the United States, headed by her former professor William R. Nichols.

In 1884, she was appointed as an instructor in sanitary chemistry at a newly formed MIT laboratory for the study of sanitation.

Mrs. Richards was a consulting chemist for the Massachusetts State Board of Health from 1872 to 1875, and the Commonwealth's official water analyst from 1887 until 1897. She also served as nutrition expert for the US Department of Agriculture.

== Scientific experiments ==
=== Air and water quality ===
In the 1880s, her interests turned toward issues of air and water quality. At the request of the Massachusetts State Board of Health she performed a series of water tests on 40,000 samples of local waters which served as drinking water for their immediate populations. These led to the so-called "Richards' Normal Chlorine Map" which was predictive of inland water pollution in the state of Massachusetts. This map plotted the chloride concentrations in waters of the state. It illustrated the natural distribution of chlorides from the ocean. (Her survey long preceded the practice of road de-icing with chlorine derivative salts.) Her map plotted greater than 6.5 parts per million (ppm) of chloride near the coast, with Cape Cod concentrations well in excess of 10 ppm and with a near-steady decreasing gradient to less than 1 ppm about the Berkshire Hills in the extreme western end of the state. Thereby waters with chloride concentrations that deviated from the plot could be suspected of human pollution. As a result, Massachusetts established the first water-quality standards in America and the first modern sewage treatment plant was created in Lowell, Massachusetts. Outside of running tests on water and air quality she spent time theorizing that air and water were aspects of nutrition. Swallows emphasized the importance of the cleanliness or air and water in essays like "Water and Air as Food" in Plain Words About Food (1899).

=== Mineralogy ===
Richards' master's thesis at Vassar was an analysis of the amount of vanadium in iron ore. She performed numerous experiments in mineralogy, including the discovery of an insoluble residue of the rare mineral samarskite. This was later determined by other scientists to yield samarium and gadolinium. In 1879, she was recognized by the American Institute of Mining and Metallurgical Engineers as their first female member.

=== Home sanitation ===
Richards applied her scientific knowledge to the home. Since women were responsible for the home and family nutrition at the time, Richards felt that all women should be educated in the sciences. She wrote books about science for use in the home, such as The Chemistry of Cooking and Cleaning, published in 1882. Her book Food Materials and Their Adulterations(1885) led to the passing of the first Pure Food and Drug Act in Massachusetts.

She used her own home as a kind of experimental laboratory for healthier living through science. She moved from using coal heating and cooking oil to gas, concerned with the air quality in her home. She and her husband installed fans to pull air from the home to the outside to create a cleaner air environment within the home. She also determined the water quality of the property's well through chemical testing, and to ensure that wastewater was not contaminating the drinking water.

=== Euthenics ===
Richards derived the term euthenics from the Greek verb Eutheneo, Εὐθηνέω (eu, well; the, root of tithemi, to cause). To be in a flourishing state, to abound in, to prosper.—Demosthenes. To be strong or vigorous.—Herodotus. To be vigorous in body.—Aristotle. And from the Greek Euthenia, Εὐθηνία. Good state of the body: prosperity, good fortune, abundance.—Herodotus. The opposite of Euthenia is Penia - Πενία ("deficiency" or "poverty") the personification of poverty and need.

In her book Euthenics: the science of controllable environment (1910), she defined the term as the betterment of living conditions, through conscious endeavor, for the purpose of securing efficient human beings.

Vigorous debate about its exact meaning, confusion with the term eugenics, followed by the Great Depression and two world wars, were among the many factors which led to the movement never really getting the funding, nor the attention needed to put together a lasting, vastly multidisciplinary curriculum as defined by Richards. Instead, different disciplines such as Child Study became one such curriculum.

Martin Heggestad of the Mann Library notes that:

Starting around 1920, however, home economists tended to move into other fields, such as nutrition and textiles, that offered more career opportunities, while health issues were dealt with more in the hard sciences and in the professions of nursing and public health. Also, improvements in public sanitation (for example, the wider availability of sewage systems and of food inspection) led to a decline in infectious diseases and thus a decreasing need for the largely household-based measures taught by home economists.

Richards was the first writer to use the term euthenics, in The Cost of Shelter (1905), with the meaning "the science of better living".

=== Laboratory work ===
After her first experience as water analyst under Professor Nichols, Richards began a large, private practice in sanitary chemistry, including testing water, air and food, and the testing of wallpapers and fabrics for arsenic. In 1878 and 1879 she examined a large number of staple groceries for the state. The results of her investigation were published in the first annual report of the Board of Health, Lunacy and Charity, which had succeeded the earlier Board of Health.

She also served as a consultant to the Manufacturers Mutual Fire Insurance Company and in 1900 wrote the textbook Air, Water, and Food from a Sanitary Standpoint, with A. G. Woodman. Her interest in the environment led her to introduce the word ecology into English around 1892. The word had been coined by German biologist Ernst Haeckel to describe the "household of nature".

Richards' interests also included applying scientific principles to domestic situations, such as nutrition, clothing, physical fitness, sanitation, and efficient home management, creating the field of home economics. "Perhaps the fact that I am not a radical and that I do not scorn womanly duties but claim it as a privilege to clean up and sort of supervise the room and sew things is winning me stronger allies than anything else," she wrote to her parents. She published The Chemistry of Cooking and Cleaning: A Manual for House-keepers in 1881, designed and demonstrated model kitchens, devised curricula, and organized conferences.

== Women's education ==
=== Woman's Laboratory assistant instructor ===
Mrs. Richards appeared before the Woman's Education Association of Boston on November 11, 1875, and in an address, which made a deep impression, set forth the needs of women. She expressed the belief that the governing board of the Institute of Technology would provide space for a woman's laboratory if the Association would supply the necessary money for instruments, apparatus, and books. She said that scholarships would be indispensable.

The Woman's Education Association appointed a committee to enter into discussions with the Institute of Technology, which led to the creation of the MIT Woman's Laboratory in November 1876. The Institute provided a small building, planned for a gymnasium, as the location of the Laboratory. Mrs. Richards became an unpaid assistant instructor in 1879 in chemical analysis, industrial chemistry, mineralogy, and applied biology under Professor John M. Ordway. The Woman's Education Association agreed to raise money to buy equipment for the laboratory.

A new building, erected by the institute in 1883, reserved space for all laboratory students' use, women as well as men. The original Woman's Laboratory was closed and the building demolished.

In 1884, Mrs. Richards was appointed Instructor in Sanitary Chemistry in the Institute of Technology itself, a position which she filled until the time of her death. In addition to her faculty duties and instructional work, she was also the "untitled" Dean of Women.

=== American correspondence school instructor ===
In January 1876, Mrs. Richards began a long association with the first American correspondence school, the Society to Encourage Studies at Home, as an instructor, and developed its science department.

In 1886, a new section promoted by Richards, Sanitary Science, was established by the Society. This was at a time when household conveniences employing water, gas, or electricity were becoming more common. However, housekeepers seldom understood the dangers or difficulties inherent in using these new appliances. She saw that instruction was needed and the Society began to provide information on how to organize a house on truly scientific principles.

=== American Association of University Women ===
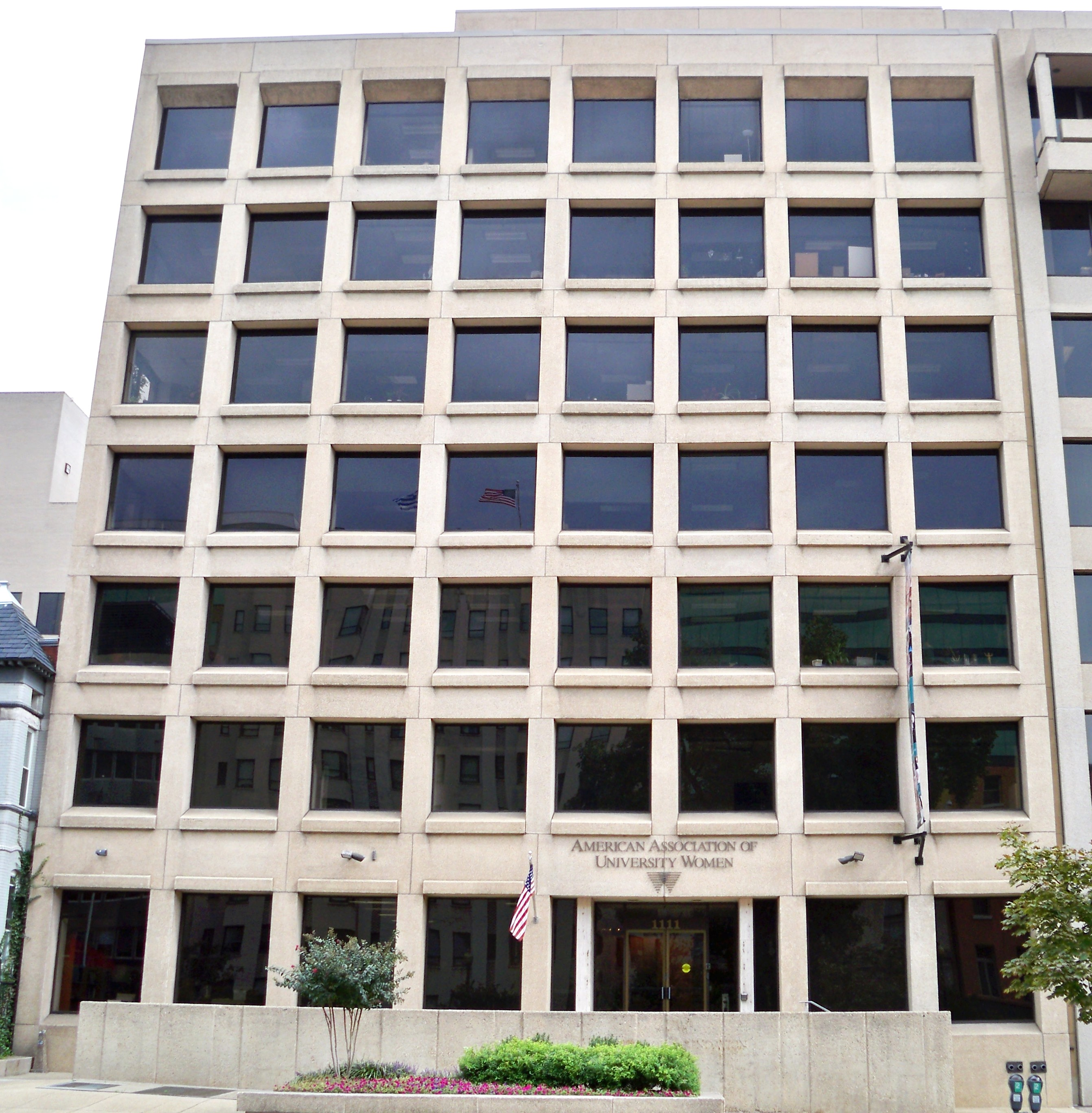
Headquarters of the AAUW in Washington DC

Richards, Emily Fairbanks Talbot, and Marion Talbot (Boston University class of 1880) became the "founding mothers" of what was to become the American Association of University Women (AAUW) when they invited fifteen other women college graduates to a meeting at Marion Talbot's home in Boston, on November 28, 1881. The group envisioned an organization in which women college graduates would band together to open the doors of higher education to other women and to find wider opportunities for their training. The Association of Collegiate Alumnae (ACA), AAUW's predecessor organization, was officially founded on January 14, 1882.

=== Teachers' School of Science ===
Lucretia Crocker, along with women's clubs and other help in the Boston area, created a "Teachers' School of Science" in Back Bay at the New Museum of the Boston society. Along with Mrs. Richards, Crocker created a mineralogy course for teachers. Scientists in the Boston area offered their teaching services for the school, allowing teachers to easily take such courses.

=== New England Kitchen of Boston ===
On January 1, 1890, Richards collaborated with Mary Hinman Abel (1850–1938) to found the New England Kitchen of Boston, at 142 Pleasant Street. Using volunteers of modest circumstances, they experimented with ways to prepare the most inexpensive, tasty and nutritious food.

Years later, Mrs. Richards, herself, wrote in her preface to part one of The Rumford kitchen leaflets: No. 17, The Story of the New England Kitchen; Part II; A study in social economics, by Mary Abel:

The story of the New England Kitchen ... is remarkable for two things: the new and valuable information which has been acquired, as the result of the daily work of the Kitchen, and the short time which has sufficed to put the enterprise on a business basis.

It is well to emphasize the causes of this success, that the lessons in social science and practical philanthropy be not lost. A large part of the credit is due ... to Mrs. Abel's hard work[.] [S]tarting the New England Kitchen ... was ... an experiment to determine the successful conditions of preparing, by scientific methods, from the cheaper food materials, nutritious and palatable dishes, which should find a ready demand at paying prices.

Mrs. Abel would doubtless give as the principal secret of her success, that she had everything necessary for the experiments, without giving a thought to the cost. ... In the New England Kitchen, the selection of the apparatus and material and the employment of labor have been without restriction. Without this freedom to carry on the experiments as seemed wise and prudent, the results detailed in the accompanying report could not have been attained.

The philanthropy of the scheme rests in the experimental stage of the development of the New England Kitchen. Whether the business can in the future take care of itself to the profit of those who conduct it remains to be seen; but, in any event, kitchens of this kind cannot fail to be of great advantage to multitudes in moderate circumstances, who have hitherto been unable to buy good, nutritious, and tasteful cooked food.

=== Rumford Kitchen ===
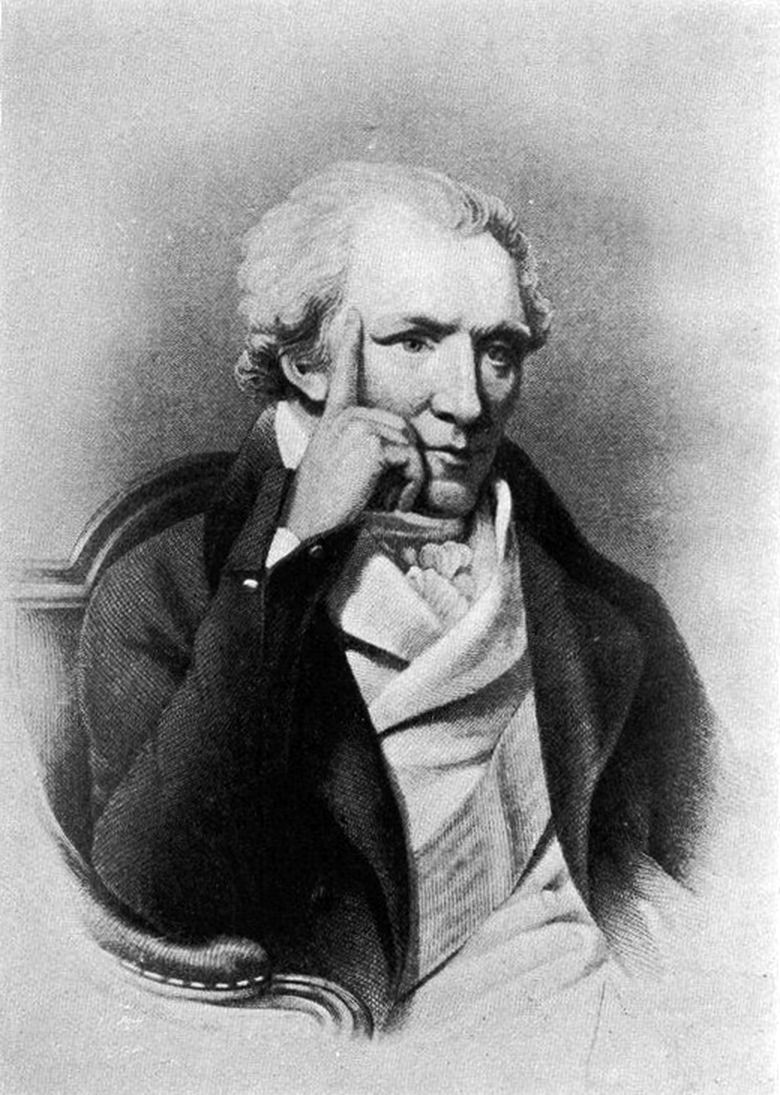
Count Rumford frontispiece of the Rumford Kitchen leaflets

In 1893, when Richards was in charge of the Rumford Kitchen at the World's Fair in Chicago, she accepted the added work and responsibility of arranging an exhibition of the work of Studies at Home.

The opening statement of the Guide to the Rumford Kitchen: An Exhibit made by the State of Massachusetts in connection with the Bureau of Hygiene and Sanitation (World's Columbian Exposition, Chicago, 1893) by General Francis A. Walker explains:

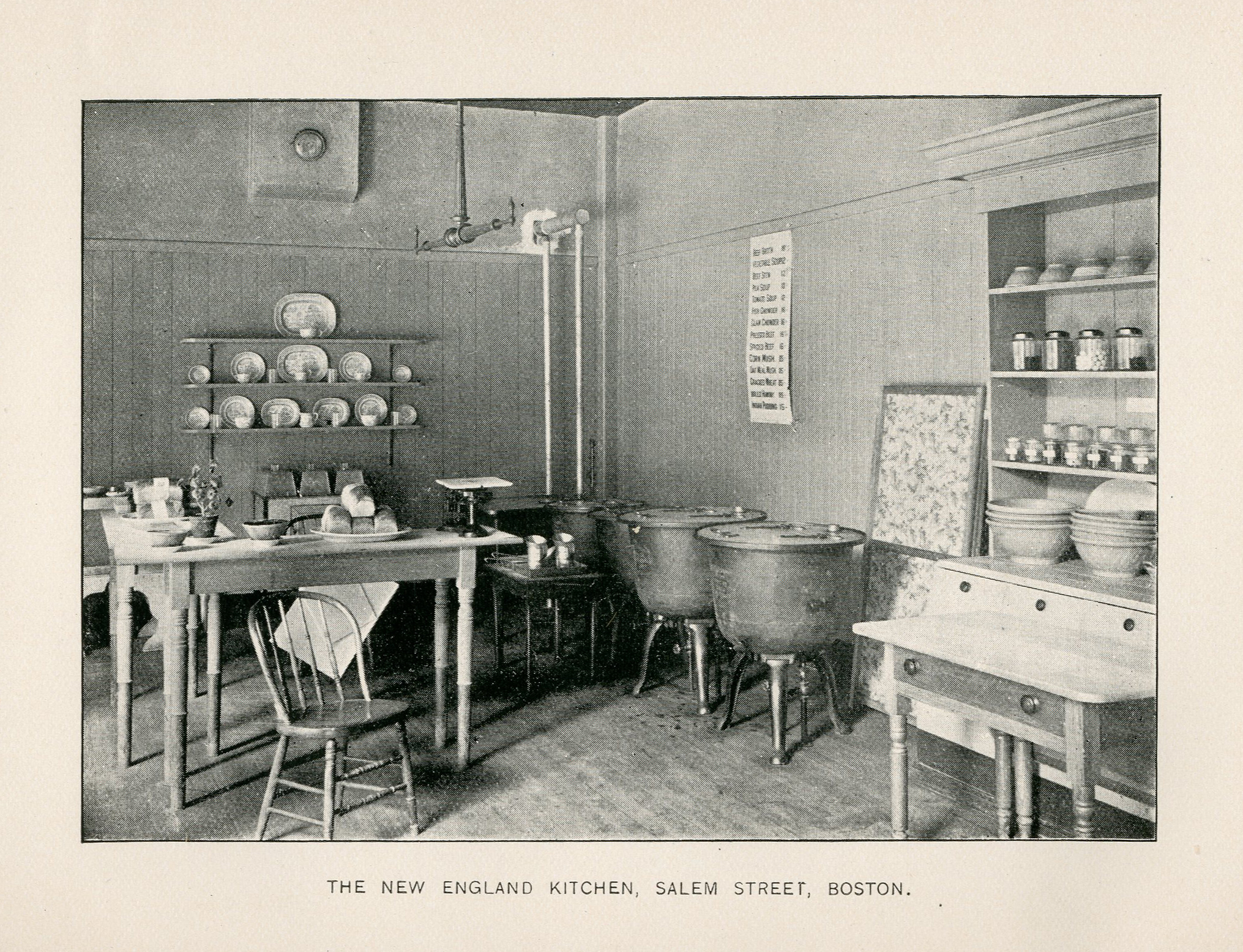
Photo from Rumford Kitchen Leaflets by Ellen Swallow Richards (1899)

The exhibit known as the Rumford Kitchen is the outgrowth of the work, in the application of the principles of chemistry to the science of cooking, which has for three years been carried on as an educational agency by Mrs. Robert H. Richards and Mrs. Dr. John J. Abel, with pecuniary assistance from certain public-spirited citizens of Boston.

The Massachusetts Board of World's Fair Managers, ... believing that such practical demonstration of the usefulness of domestic science could not fail to be of advantage to multitudes of visitors to the Columbian Exposition, have invited the ladies named to open the Rumford Kitchen as a part of the exhibit of Massachusetts in connection with the Bureau of Hygiene and Sanitation.

In order to reduce, in some degree, the expenses of this exhibit, the food cooked in the Rumford Kitchen will be sold under a concession from the administration of the Exposition; but it should be understood that this is not a money-making exhibit; that nothing is cooked for the sake of being sold; and that the enterprise is to be regarded as absolutely a scientific and educational one.

The purpose of the exhibit in the Rumford Kitchen is two-fold: First, to commemorate the services to the cause of domestic science rendered by Count Rumford one hundred years ago[;] ... second, to serve as an incentive to further work in the same direction, as he expressed it," to provoke men to investigation," "to cause doubt, that first step toward knowledge."

The first commercially available "modern" kitchen ranges began to appear around 1800, they were the invention of an American named Sir Benjamin Thompson, Count von Rumford.

=== American Public School Lunch Program ===
A major program was started in some Boston high schools in 1894 to provide nutritional meals at low prices to children who would not normally have them. Due in large part to Ellen Richards and Edward Atkinson, the New England Kitchen ran the program as a 'private enterprise' that paid for itself many times over. The lunches never became effective instruments for teaching the New Nutrition the founders had envisaged. However, the program provided nutritious meals children would otherwise not have, so it became the main justification for similar lunch programs in other cities."

In 1946, President Harry S. Truman signed into law the National School Lunch Program to provide low-cost or free school lunch meals to qualified students through subsidies to schools. The program was established as a way to prop up food prices by absorbing farm surpluses, while at the same time providing food to school age children. It was named after Richard Russell, Jr.

=== Lake Placid Conference ===
Early in September 1899, trustees of the Lake Placid Club (in the Adirondacks) thought it was the right time to bring together those most interested in home science, or household economics and sent out many invitations for the Lake Placid Conference scheduled to take place September 19–25, 1899. Melvil Dewey, one of the club's trustees, personally invited Richards to attend. She gave a lecture on standards of living and was elected chairman of the conference.

=== American Home Economics Association ===
In 1908, Richards was chosen as the first president of the newly formed American Home Economics Association, which was renamed the American Association of Family and Consumer Sciences in 1994. She also founded and funded the Association's periodical, the Journal of Home Economics, which began publication in 1909. It was renamed the Journal of Family and Consumer Sciences in 1994 when the Association changed its name.

Her books and writings on this topic include Food Materials and their Adulterations (1886); Conservation by Sanitation; The Chemistry of Cooking and Cleaning; The Cost of Living (1899); Air, Water, and Food (1900); The Cost of Food; The Cost of Shelter; The Art of Right Living; The Cost of Cleanness; Sanitation in Daily Life (1907); and Euthenics, the Science of Controllable Environment (1910). Some of these went through several editions.

== Death ==
Richards died on March 30, 1911, at her home in Jamaica Plain, Massachusetts, after suffering with angina. She is buried in the family cemetery in Gardiner, Maine.

== Legacy ==
- Ellen Swallow Richards Residence
- U.S. National Register of Historic Places
- U.S. National Historic Landmark
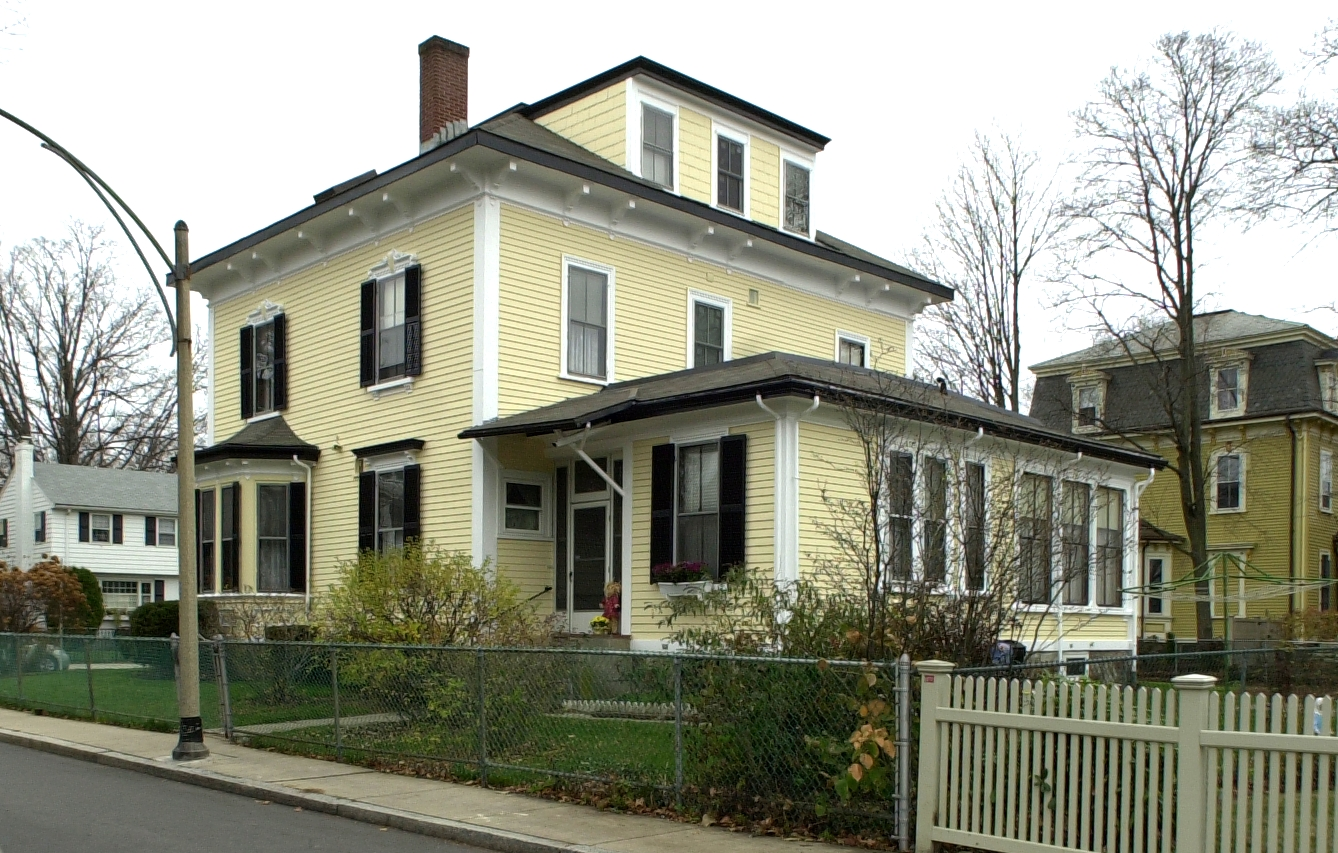

- Location within Massachusetts
- Location: 32 Eliot St., Jamaica Plain, Massachusetts
- Coordinates: 42°18′41.5″N 71°7′3.5″W
- Area: 0.2 acres (0.081 ha)
- Architectural style: Italianate
- NRHP reference No.: 92001874
- Added to NRHP: March 31, 1992

- The Ellen Swallow Richards House was designated a National Historic Landmark in 1992.
- In 1925, Vassar College, based around alumna Richards' ideas, began an interdisciplinary curriculum of euthenics studies located in their recently constructed Minnie Cumnock Blodgett Hall of Euthenics, which was officially dedicated in 1929.
- In her honor, MIT designated a room in the main building for the use of female students and, on the occasion of the hundredth anniversary of Richard's graduation in 1973, established the Ellen Swallow Richards professorship for distinguished female faculty members.
- In 1993, Richards was inducted into the National Women's Hall of Fame.
- In 2011, she was listed as number eight on the MIT150 list of the top 150 innovators and ideas from MIT with the tag line, "Drink up", in reference to her work on assuring the safety of the domestic water supply.
- She is commemorated on the Boston Women's Heritage Trail.
- Swallow Union Elementary School in her hometown of Dunstable, Massachusetts is named in her honor.

== Selected works ==
- Richards, Ellen (1898) [1885]. Food materials and their adulterations. Boston: Estes and Lauriat, (1885); Home Science Publishing Co. (iv, 183).
- Richards, Ellen (1899). Plain words about food: the Rumford kitchen leaflets 1899. Boston: Home Science Publishing Co. (176, [10] leaves of plates).
- Richards, Ellen (1904). First lessons in food and diet (1st ed.). Boston: Whitcomb & Barrows.
- Richards, Ellen (1905). The Cost of Shelter (1st ed.). New York: John Wiley & Sons; [etc.] ISBN 1414230125.
- Richards, Ellen (1906?). Meat and drink. Boston: Health-Education League.
- Richards, Ellen (c.1908). The Efficient worker. Boston: Health-Education League.
- Richards, Ellen (c.1908). Health in labor camps. Boston: Health-Education League.
- Richards, Ellen (1908 or 1909). Tonics and stimulants. Boston: Health-Education League.
- Richards, Ellen (1909) [1900]. Air, water, and food: from a sanitary standpoint (3rd ed.). New York: John Wiley & Sons, etc. with Alpheus G. Woodman.
- Richards, Ellen (1912) [1910]. Euthenics: The Science of Controllable Environment : A Plea for Better Conditions As a First Step Toward Higher Human Efficiency (2nd ed.). Boston: Whitcomb & Barrows. ISBN 0405098278.
- Sumida, Kazuko, ed. (2007) Collected Works of Ellen H. Swallow Richards. (5 vols.) Tokyo: Edition Synapse. ISBN 978-4-86166-048-1

== Manuscript collections ==
Richards's manuscripts are contained in various collections throughout the United States and beyond. Aside from those listed below, manuscripts can be found within collections related to the organizations Richards was associated with, such as the American Association of Family and Consumer Sciences, whose manuscripts are housed in several collections at Cornell University, Iowa State University, etc.

== See also ==
- Euthenics
- Home economics
- Oekology
- Sanitation
- Ellen Swallow Richards Residence
- Timeline of women in science
