= Marion Talbot =

American women's educator (1858–1948)

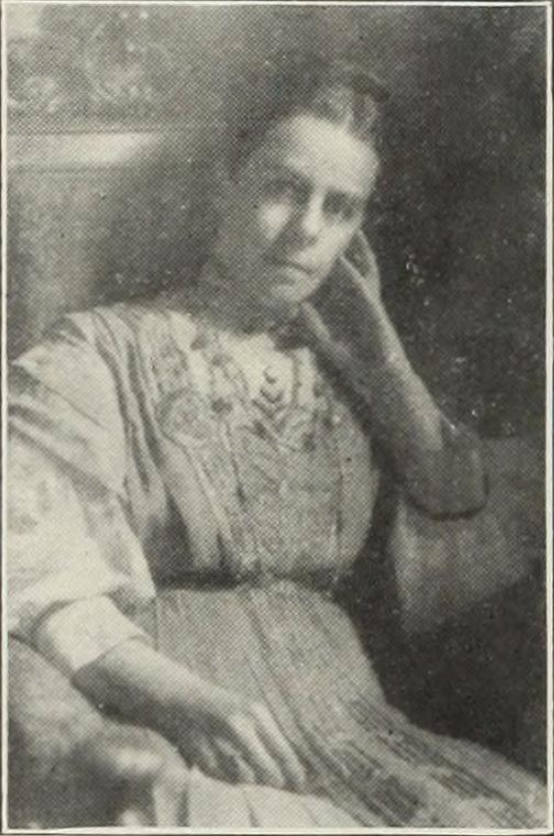
- Born: July 31, 1858; Thun, Switzerland
- Died: October 20, 1948 (aged 90)
- Education: Boston University
- Known for: Co-founder of American Association of University Women

Marion Talbot (July 31, 1858 – October 20, 1948) was an American educator who served as Dean of Women at the University of Chicago from 1895 to 1925, and an influential leader in the higher education of women in the United States during the early 20th century. In 1882, while still a student, she co-founded the American Association of University Women with her mentor Ellen Swallow Richards. During her long career at the University of Chicago, Talbot fought tenaciously and often successfully to improve support for women students and faculty, and against efforts to restrict equal access to educational opportunities.

== Early life ==
Talbot was born in Thun, Switzerland, while her parents were on a long European trip, but grew up in Boston. She was the eldest of six children born to Emily Fairbanks Talbot and Israel Talbot, who was dean of the Boston University School of Medicine. Her mother was an activist and former teacher; the paucity of college preparatory opportunities for her daughters led her to work to establish the Boston Latin Academy, the first all-girls' college preparatory academy in the United States.

Talbot herself, however, was the eldest and did not benefit from that effort directly; she attended the Chapel Hill – Chauncy Hall School near Boston, and subsequently attended Boston University, where her mother had to work aggressively to secure her admission. Talbot earned an AB there in 1880 and an AM in 1882. She additionally obtained an BS from MIT, where she studied under domestic science pioneer Ellen Swallow Richards, who had established her own laboratory there. Talbot initially dropped out due to poor conditions for women at MIT, but completed the degree in 1888.

In 1882, she and Richards co-founded the Association of Collegiate Alumnae, which in 1921 became the American Association of University Women. She was secretary of the association from its founding to 1895, and president from 1895 to 1897. Along with Dr. Lois Kimball Mathews Rosenberry, she co-authored the history of the Association, "A History of the American Association of University Women, 1881-1931".

From 1890 to 1892, Talbot taught domestic science at Wellesley College. In 1892, she took up the position of assistant professor in the Department of Social Science and Anthropology, at the newly created University of Chicago. She also took responsibility for the education of undergraduate women, as the assistant to Alice Freeman Palmer, dean of graduate women. Palmer ceded the deanship to Talbot in 1895; because Palmer's position was largely ceremonial, Talbot was often considered the first Dean of Women.

== Deanship ==
Talbot was appointed Dean of Women at the U of C in 1899, giving her responsibility for all women students at the university. She worked to elevate deanship as a profession, establishing the first Midwestern regional meetings of deans in 1902. The Association of Collegiate Alumnae, which she had co-founded, also began hosting regular meetings of Deans of women in 1911.

University of Chicago founder William Rainey Harper was a skeptic of coeducation, although he had been persuaded to accept it at the university from the beginning. Around the turn of the century, the university administration became concerned that a majority of the student body was now female. They pushed for sex-segregated education in the junior college, and Talbot led the resistance against this.

Because of her commitment to maintaining equal access to the university for women, Talbot was concerned about the risk that a breach of decorum on the part of female students might give the administration an excuse to limit access. She accordingly maintained strict standards for conduct, and developed a democratic "house system" in which the women lived in dedicated residence halls under the supervision of faculty; she served as resident head of Green Hall until retirement. The house system, which excluded sororities and secret societies, was eventually adopted by the university for male students as well. Talbot's leadership was popular among the female students; in 1902, a university publication equated her role among the women with that of famed coach Alonzo Stagg among the men.

Talbot's prominent role occasionally brought her into the center of public controversy. A sensational slander case against Talbot drew nationwide press attention in 1912. She had expelled undergraduate student Esther Mercy on grounds of bad character, and Mercy sued for $100,000 in damages; the district court found in Mercy's favor and awarded her $2,500, but the decision was overturned on appeal.

In 1915, Talbot publicly defended the action of the principal of Wendell Phillips High School to allow racially integrated social activities, receiving ferocious hate mail in response.

== Academic career ==
Talbot was a specialist in domestic science, and became head of the newly created Department of Household Administration at the University of Chicago in 1904. Her assistant in the department was Sophonisba Breckinridge. Talbot also co-founded the American Home Economics Association in 1908.

Talbot advocated a much more active and scientific approach to home economics than prevailed in subsequent decades. This was motivated in part by her concern that the field would become a female ghetto if standards of rigor were not upheld. However, this approach did not outlast her at the University of Chicago; after her retirement, the Department of Household Administration was merged into the home economics department in the School of Education.

Talbot joined the editorial board of the American Journal of Sociology in 1895.

== Later life and legacy ==
My hope is that I may live through my influence. I have no desire for any other kind of immortality.

— Marion Talbot, note to Sophonisba Breckinridge, n.d.

Talbot announced her retirement from the University of Chicago in 1925.

After retiring, Talbot traveled to Turkey in 1927–28 to serve as acting president of the Constantinople College for Women, returning to serve as full president from 1931 to 1932.

In retirement, Talbot remained actively engaged in the affairs of the university; in 1944, she castigated university chancellor Robert Maynard Hutchins for focusing on purely pecuniary aims, saying "I remember and cherish your exhortation that university training has the power and duty to make use of the mind its highest aim."

Talbot died in Chicago in 1948 of chronic myocarditis. She was buried at the Oak Woods Cemetery in Chicago.

== Writings ==
- House Sanitation: Manual for Housekeepers (first edition coedited with Ellen Richards, 1887; many subsequent editions)
- Food as a Factor in Student Life (1894, coauthored with Ellen Richards)
- The Education of Women (1910)
- The Modern Household (1912, coauthored with Sophonisba Breckinridge)
- More than Lore (1925)
- The History of the American Association of University Women 1881–1931 (1931, coauthored with Lois Rosenberry)

== Works cited ==
- Fitzpatrick, Ellen (1993). "Marion Talbot 1858-1948: For the "Women of the University"". In Geraldine Clifford (ed.). Lone Voyagers: Academic Women in Coeducational Institutions, 1870–1937. Feminist Press. pp. 87–124. ISBN 0935312854.
- Gillen, Alexandra (1990). "Talbot, Marion". In Rima Lunin Schulz; Adele Hast (eds.). Women Building Chicago, 1790–1990. Indiana University Press. pp. 865–868. ISBN 0253338522.
- Harvey, Joy; Ogilvie, Mary H. (2000). "Talbot, Marion". The Biographical Dictionary of Women in Science. Vol. 2. Taylor & Francis. pp. 1262–1263.
- Judith Leavitt, ed. (1985). "Talbot, Marion". American Women Managers and Administrators: A Selective Biographical Dictionary of Twentieth-Century Leaders in Business, Education, and Government. Greenwood Publishing Group. pp. 265–266. ISBN 0313237484.
- Nidiffer, Jana (1998). "Talbot, Marion". In Linda Eisenmann (ed.). Historical Dictionary of Women's Education in the United States. Greenwood Publishing Group. pp. 410–413. ISBN 0313293236.
- Storr, Richard J. (1971). "Talbot, Marion". In Edward T. James; et al. (eds.). Notable American Women, 1607–1950: A Biographical Dictionary, Volume 2. Harvard University Press. pp. 423–424. ISBN 0674627342.
