= Robert Hallowell Richards =

American mining engineer, metallurgist, and educator (1844-1945)

Robert Hallowell Richards (August 26, 1844 – March 27, 1945) was an American mining engineer, metallurgist, and educator, born at Gardiner, Maine.

In 1868, with the first class to leave the institution, he graduated from the Massachusetts Institute of Technology, and there he taught for 46 years, becoming professor of mineralogy and assaying in 1871, head of the department of mining engineering in 1873, and in 1884 professor also of metallurgy. The laboratories which he established at the Institute were the first of their kind in the world. He retired in 1914.

Richards invented a jet aspirator for chemical and physical laboratories and a prism for stadia surveying. But it was in the field of ore dressing that he became especially distinguished. He determined the curves of material settling in water, thereby establishing the fundamental principles of sorting ore by means of jigs and other machines. He invented separators for Lake Superior copper, Virginia iron, and three for ores of the Western United States. Richards served as president of the American Institute of Mining Engineers in 1886.

He was author of more than 100 monographs and articles, but his most notable work is a monumental treatise, Ore Dressing (four volumes, 1903–09). He published also a Text Book of Ore Dressing (1909).

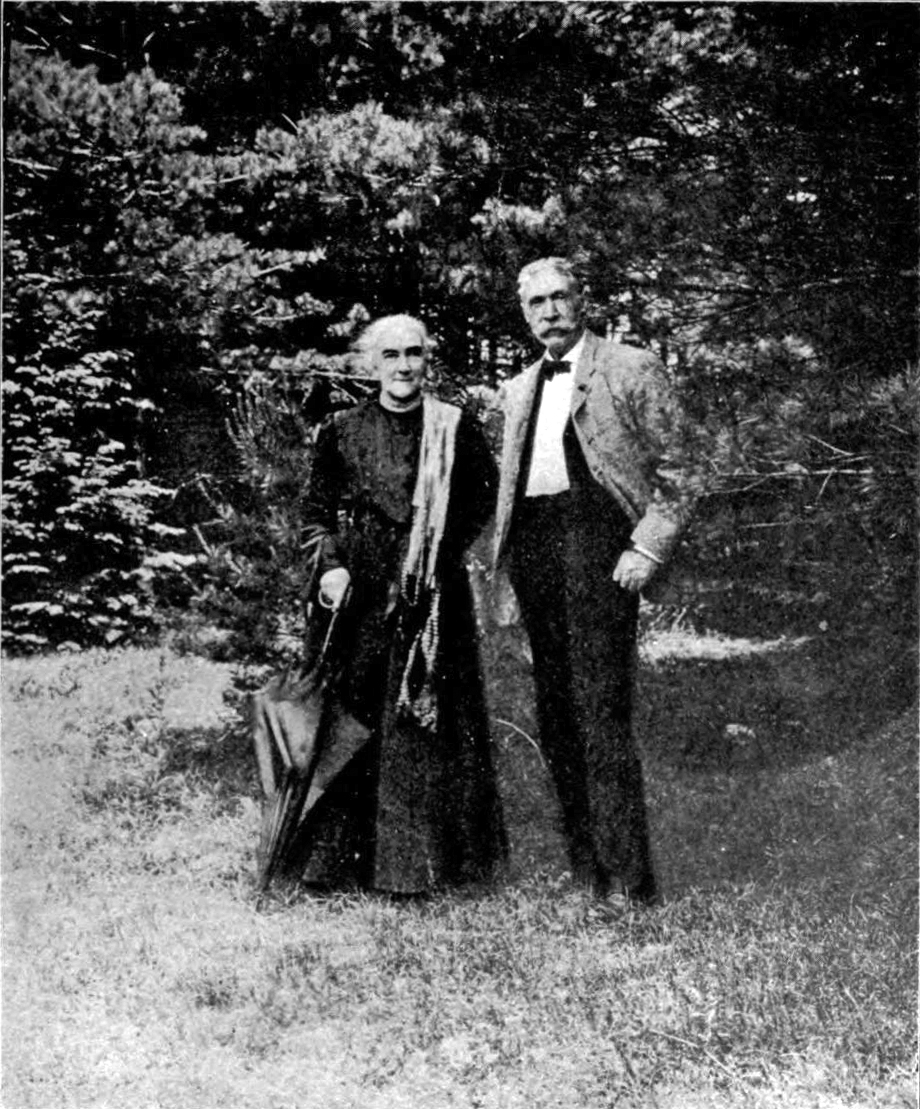
Mr. & Mrs. Richards, 1904.

Richards married Ellen Swallow Richards, the first woman graduate of MIT, on June 4, 1875. They remained married until her death in 1911. Richards married Lillian Jameson Richards (b.1866) on June 8, 1912, remaining married until her death on March 31, 1924.
