= Emily Fairbanks Talbot =

American philanthropist (1834–1900)

- Born: February 22, 1834; Winthrop, Maine
- Died: October 29, 1900 (aged 66); Holderness, New Hampshire
- Known for: Philanthropist
- Spouse: Israel Talbot
- Children: 6, 4 of whom survived childhood, including Marion Talbot

Emily Fairbanks Talbot (February 22, 1834 – October 29, 1900) was an American philanthropist. Talbot and her daughter Marion Talbot founded the organization that became the American Association of University Women.

== Early life and career ==
Emily H. Fairbanks was born February 22, 1834, in Winthrop, Maine, the daughter of Lydia Wood Tinkham and Columbus Fairbanks, a farmer. She was the eighth of nine children. In 1850, Phebe W. and Charles W. Fairbanks were at home with Emily and their parents. Three of Emily's siblings died within their first two years of life.

She was a schoolteacher and advocated for higher learning for women and health reform.

== Marriage and children ==
Emily married Israel Tisdale Talbot in 1856, becoming Emily Fairbanks Talbot. Her husband, born on October 29, 1829, in Sharon, Massachusetts, was director of the Boston homeopathic hospital and a founder, professor of surgery, and dean of the Boston University Medical School. He was involved in many public matters, which his wife shared with him.

They had six children, four of whom survived their parents:

- Marion Talbot, born in Thun, Switzerland, who was a trustee of Boston University and was then dean of women at Chicago University.
- Edith Talbot, married to Dr. William Leavitt Jackson, of Roxbury, Boston, Massachusetts
- Agnes Woodman Talbot, died in her first year
- Emily Talbot, died in her first year
- Dr. Winthrop Tinsdale (W. T.) Talbot
- Rev. Henry Russell (H. R.) Talbot of St. Stephen's Mission Church in Boston, Massachusetts

== Health and welfare care ==
Talbot is also described as a co-worker with her husband, "not just assisting her husband". She was particularly involved in homeopathic medical care and serving the Westborough Insane Hospital by sitting on the Board of Trustees.

Talbot supported the Massachusetts Infant Asylum since it was founded. She was a founder and then trustee of the Westboro Insane Hospital, that was co-founded with her husband.

== American Association of University Women ==
After the end of the Civil War (1861–1865), there was an increase in the number of schools that women could attend. The expectation, though, was generally that women would not graduate and pursue a career, but they would get married. This meant that few women who did graduate did not likely have a group of college graduates to discuss their education and career. In addition, women were not treated as potential career women.

Talbot founded the Association of Collegiate Alumnae (1881) with her daughter Marion Talbot and Ellen Swallow Richards. The organization is now named the American Association of University Women.

The organization created a network of women college graduates, including University of Michigan, Boston University, Vassar College, Oberlin College, and other colleges and universities to support female students. It directly impacted the professional lives of teachers, but ensuring they were paid more closely to a man's pay and had opportunities for promotion beyond the instructor level. The organization supported higher learning for women, including providing scholarships and fellowships. It is identified as one of the 200 events that have shaped our destiny in the book What every American should know about women's history by Christine A. Lunardini.

== Round Table ==
She helped found the literary club, Round Table.

== Death ==
Israel died at his home in Hingham, Massachusetts on July 2, 1899, and was buried at Mount Auburn Cemetery. After her husband's death, Talbot's health began to fail. She died in Holderness, New Hampshire at her summer home on October 29, 1900. Talbot and her daughter are also interred at Mount Auburn Cemetery.
