= Samuel Gregg =

American physician

- Born: July 1, 1799; New Boston, New Hampshire, United States
- Died: October 25, 1872 (aged 73); Amherst, Massachusetts
- Education: Dartmouth College
- Occupation: Doctor
- Known for: Physician who introduced homeopathy in New England.
- Relatives: Joseph Howard Jr., son-in-law

Samuel Gregg (July 1, 1799 – October 25, 1872) was an American medical doctor who is credited with introducing homeopathy into New England during the early-to mid 19th century.

== Biography ==
After graduating from Dartmouth College in 1825, Gregg was partners with Dr. John Stevens in Charlestown before establishing a successful practice in Medford, Massachusetts. It was while practicing in Medford that he began studying homeopathy with the prominent Magoun family. It was on their recommendation that Gregg worked closely with Federal Vanderburgh while treating his daughter for advanced consumption and, although she eventually died from the disease, he observed the medicinal effects during his patient's treatments and began to study New School therapeutics.

He officially changed his practice to homeopathy in 1838 and, while previous homeopathists of the period generally lost patients, Gregg's practice experienced a surge in popularity. Moving to Boston two years later, Gregg became one of the founding members of the American Institute of Homeopathy in 1844 and the Massachusetts Homeopathic Society in 1856. Forming a partnership with Herbert Codman Clapp, another prominent Boston homeopathist, he also established the Massachusetts Homeopathic Hospital and the Homeopathic Medical Dispensary around this time. Gregg continued to practice in Boston until his death in Amherst, Massachusetts, on October 25, 1872.
