= List of United Daughters of the Confederacy members =

The United Daughters of the Confederacy is an American hereditary association for women descendants of Confederate veterans of the American Civil War. Notable members and former members includes the following list.

== Living members ==
Jamie Likins

- Georgia Benton, schoolteacher and first African-American member of the UDC in Georgia
- Patricia M. Bryson, UDC president general 2016–2018
- Jane Grier Durden, UDC president general 2008–2010
- Julie Noegel Hardaway, UDC president general 2024–present
- Corinne Hoch, UDC vice president general
- Jamie Likins, UDC president general 2012–2014
- Lisa Richardson, journalist
- Ginnie Sebastian Storage, 47th President General of the Daughters of the American Revolution
- Pamela Veuleman Trammell, UDC president general 2014–2016
- Pamela Rouse Wright, 46th President General of the Daughters of the American Revolution
- Lynn Forney Young, 43rd President General of the Daughters of the American Revolution

== Deceased members ==
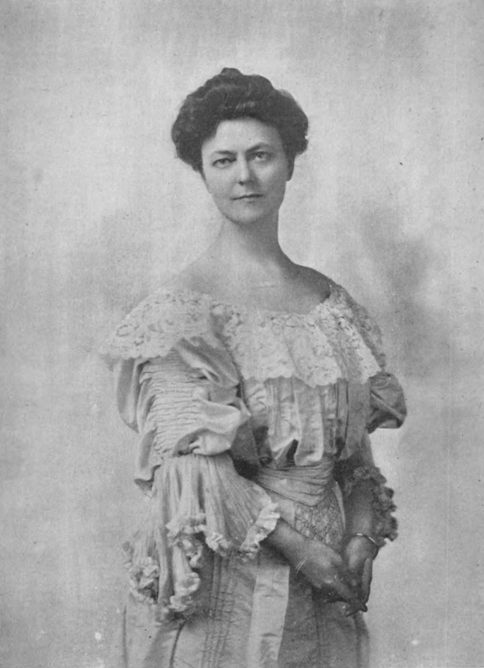
Virginia Frazer Boyle

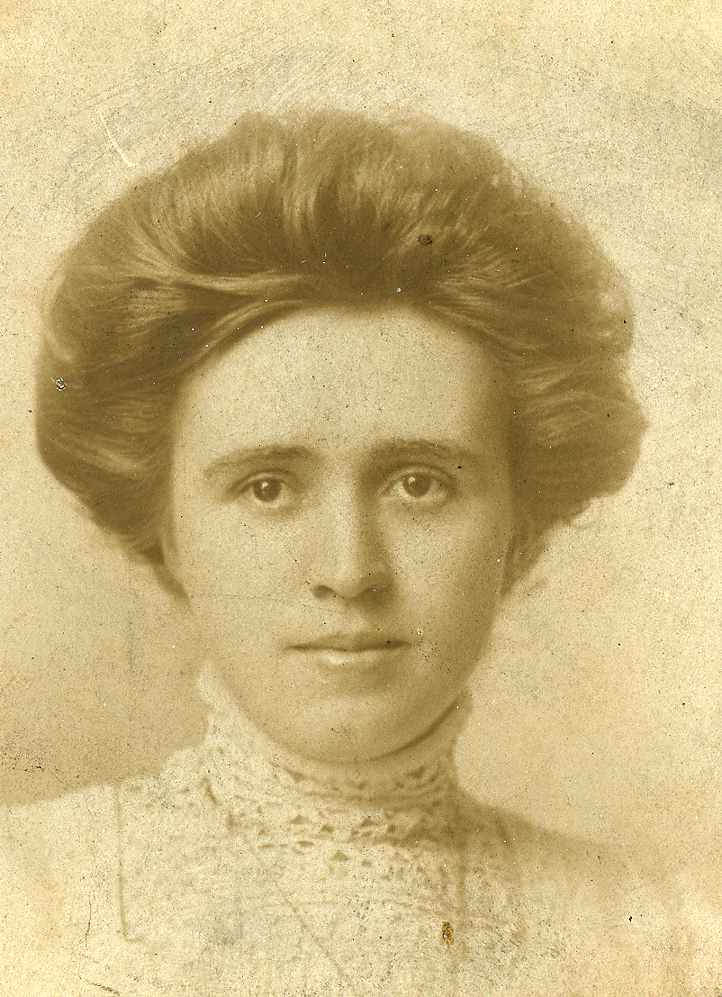
Lillian Exum Clement

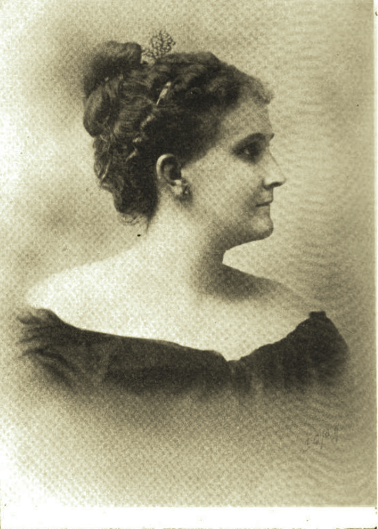
Sarah Johnson Cocke

Addie Worth Bagley Daniels

Rebecca Felton

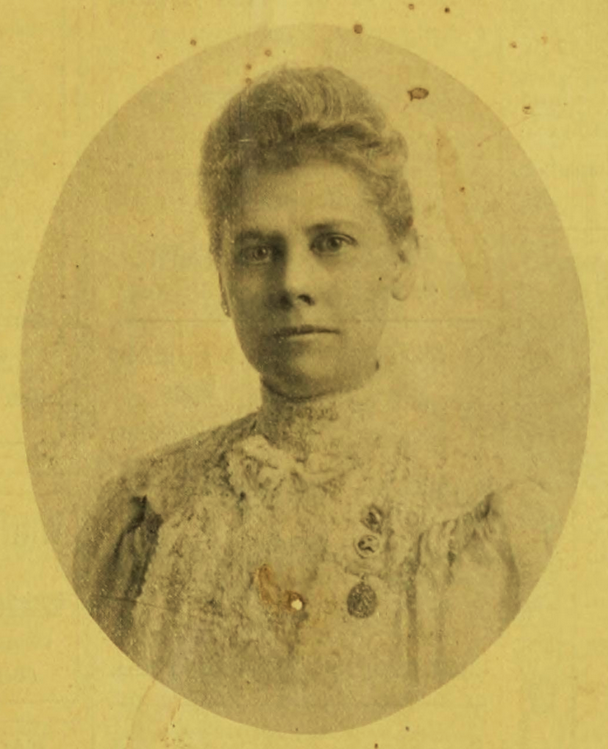
Lizzie George Henderson

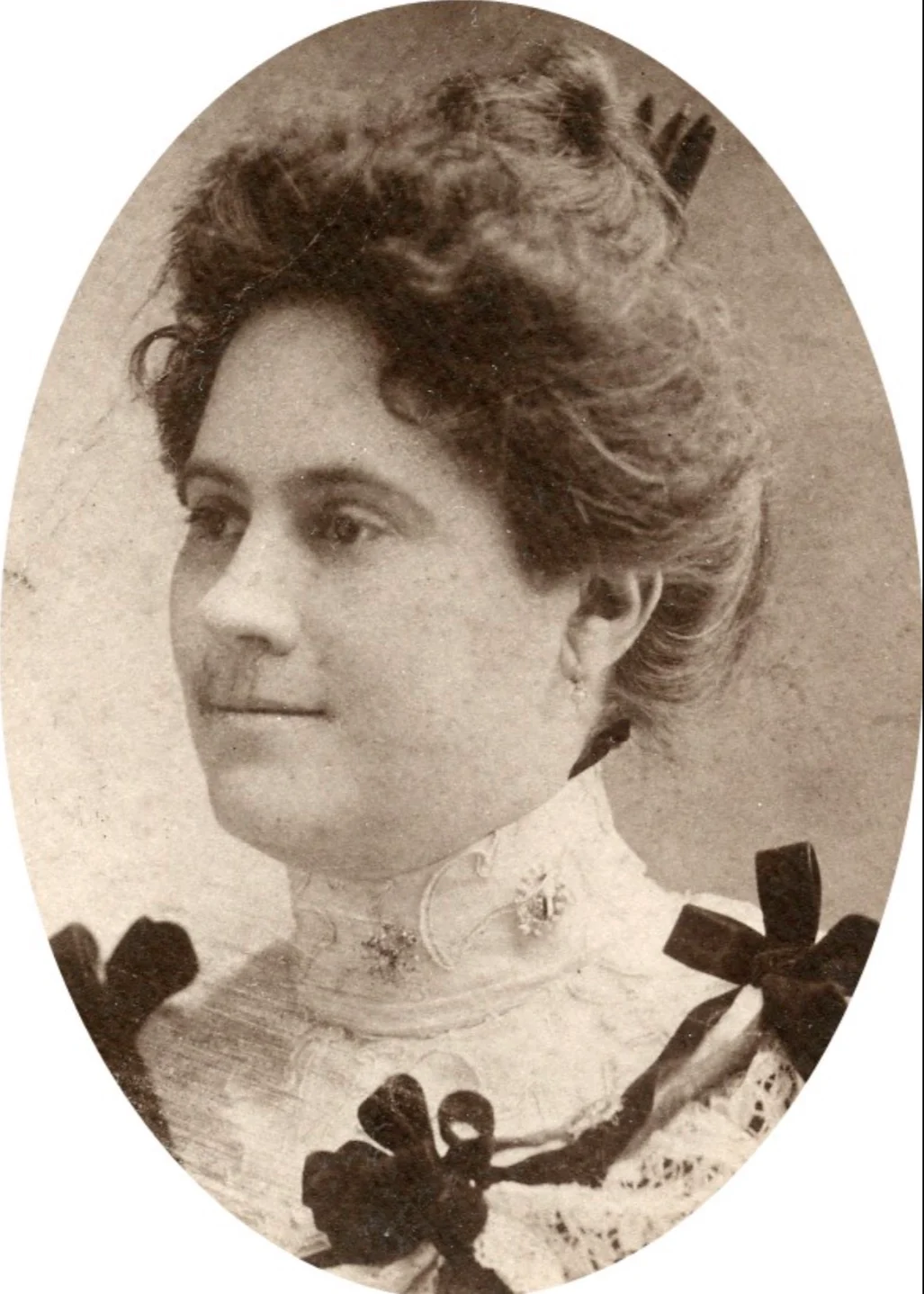
Birdie Robertson Johnson

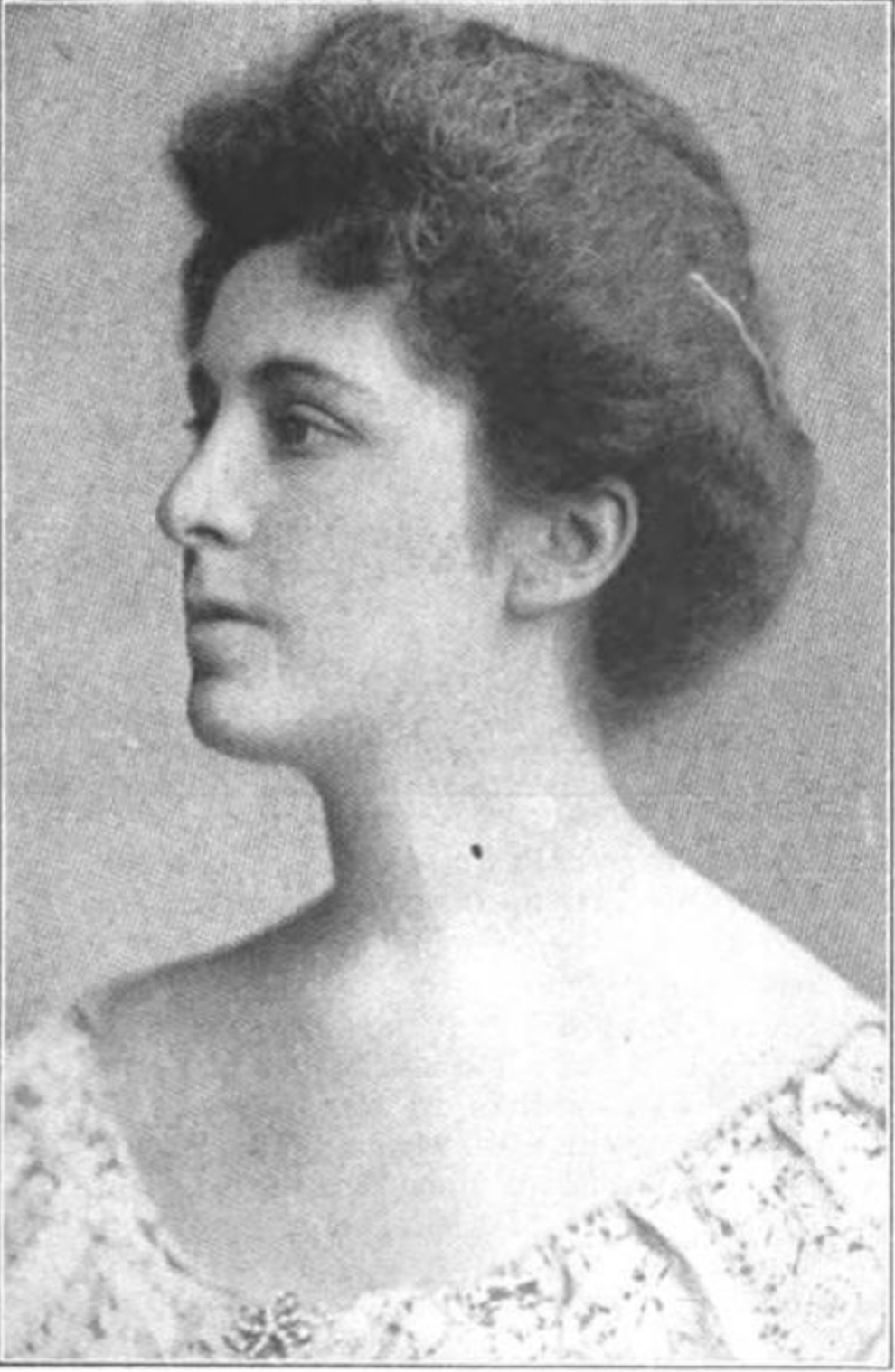
E. Jean Nelson Penfield

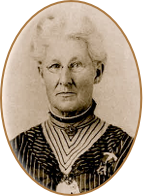
Anna Davenport Raines

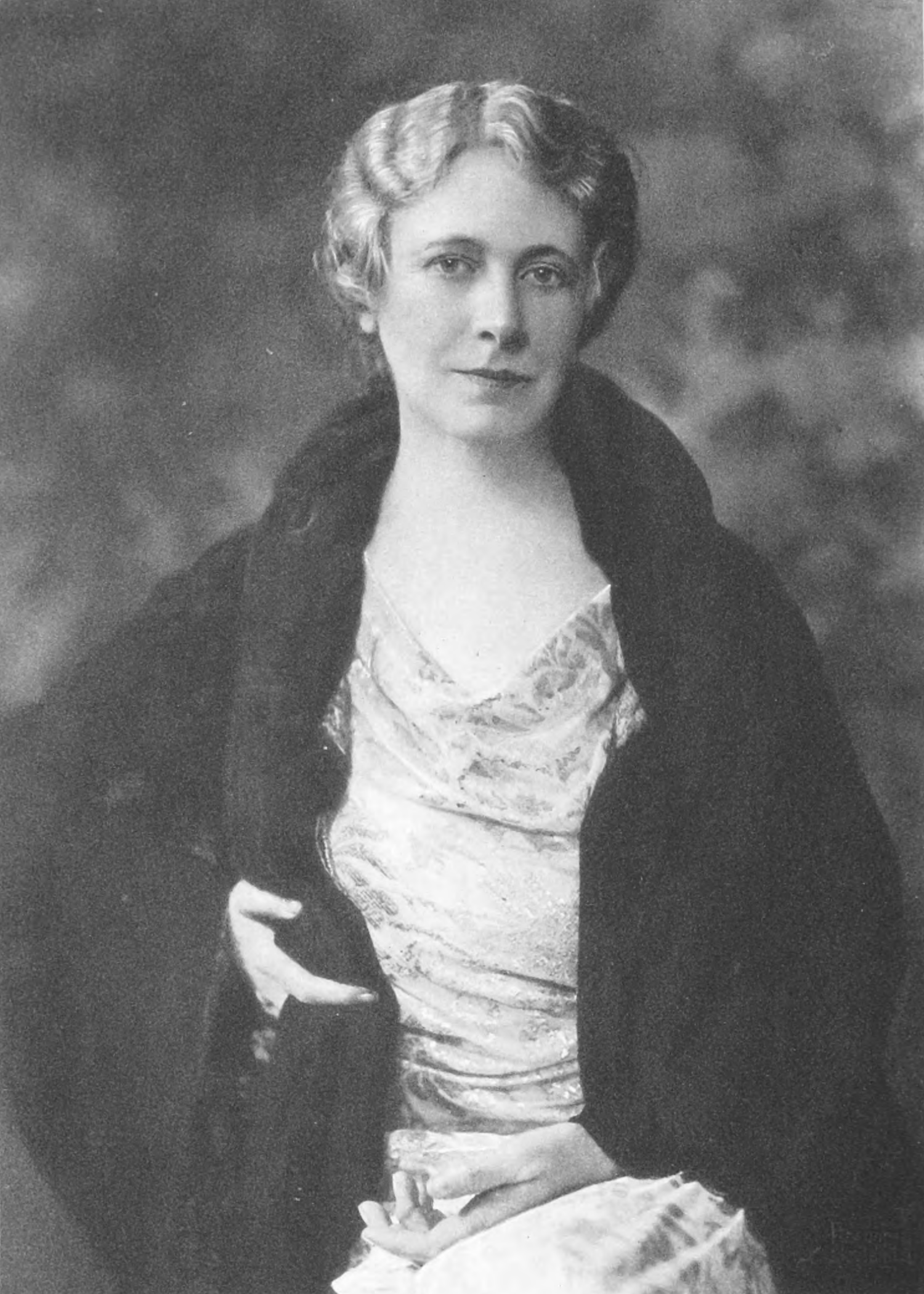
May Erwin Talmadge

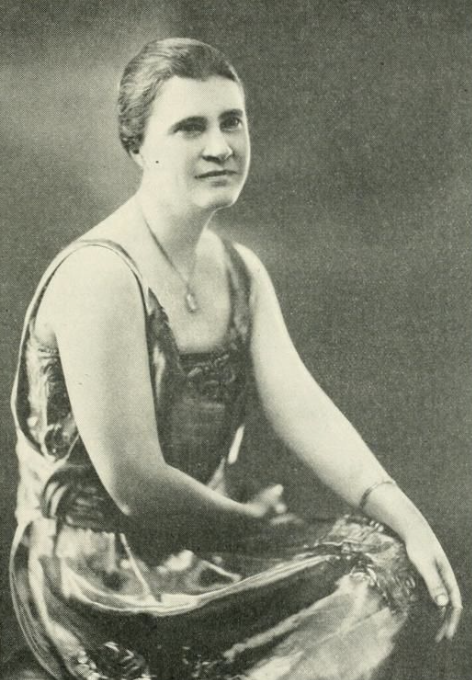
Jeanne Fox Weinmann

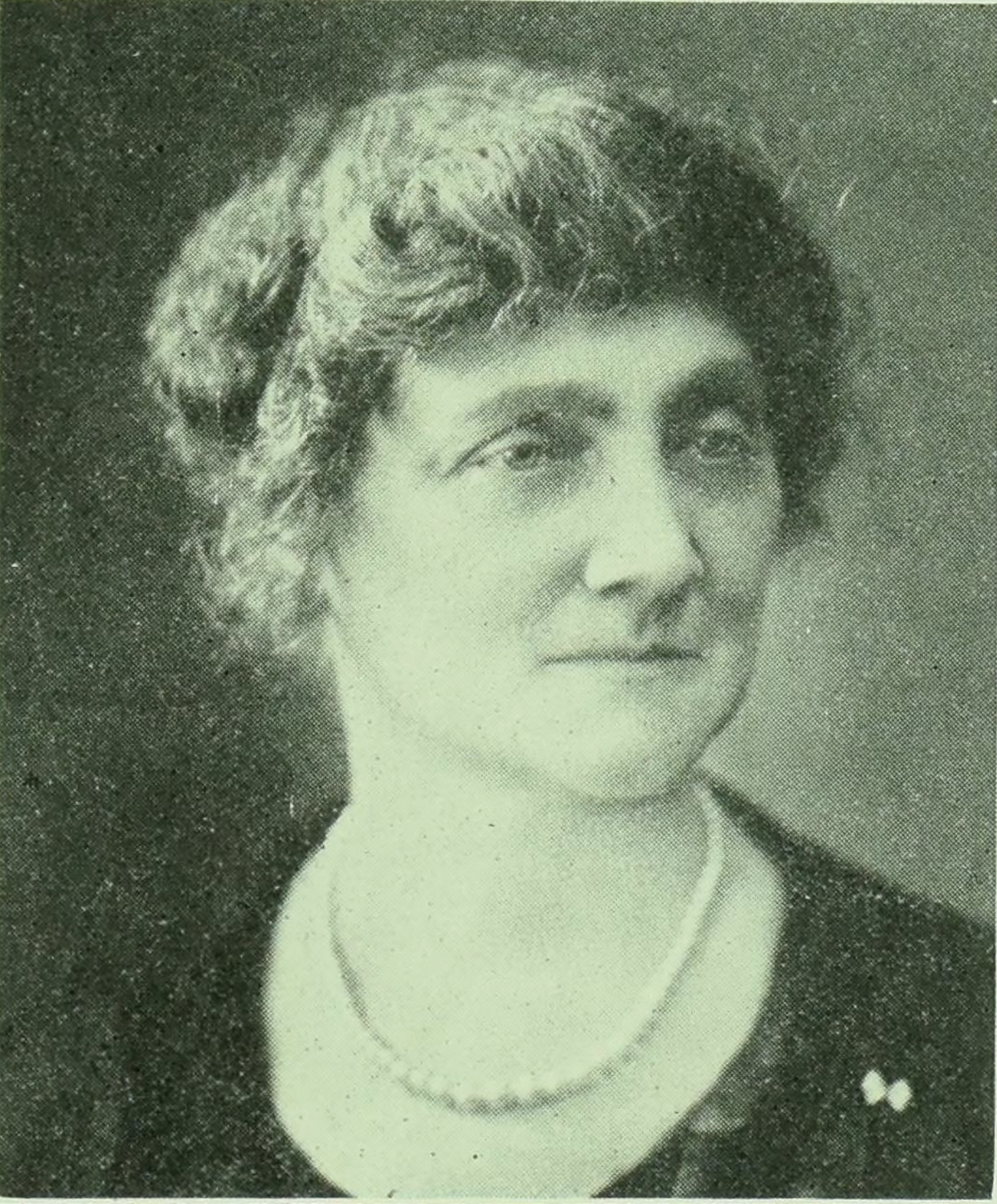
Minnie Welch

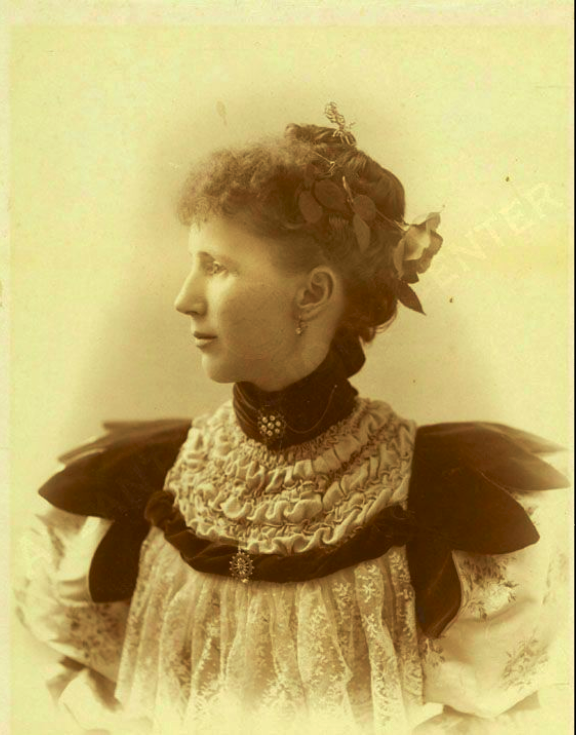
Margaret O'Conner Wilson

- Annie Lowrie Alexander (1864–1929), physician and educator
- Julia McGehee Alexander (1876–1957), politician and lawyer
- Elizabeth Cody Bachman (1898–1985), UDC President General
- Kate Walker Behan (1851–1918), club leader
- Fanny Yarborough Bickett (1870–1941), First Lady of North Carolina and first female president of the North Carolina Railroad
- Elizabeth Lee Bloomstein (1859–1927), academic and clubwoman
- Virginia Frazer Boyle (1863–1938), author
- Ella Brantley (1864–1948), clubwoman and civic leader
- Mary Forrest Bradley (1869–1965), historian and president of the Tennessee Division UDC
- Elizabeth Childress Brown (1842–1919), First Lady of Tennessee and UDC President General
- Lena Northern Buckner (1875–1939), social worker
- Frances Boyd Calhoun (1867–1909), teacher and author
- Ruth Coltrane Cannon (1891–1965), historian, preservationist, and philanthropist
- Florence Anderson Clark (1835–1918), author, newspaper editor, librarian, university dean
- Virginia Clay-Clopton (1825–1915), political hostess and activist in Alabama and Washington, DC.
- Lillian Exum Clement (1894–1925), first woman member of the North Carolina General Assembly
- Ruth Dickinson Clement (1873–1953), politician and designer of the first Flag of Oklahoma
- Alice Culler Cobb (1843–1918), educator, missionary
- Sarah Johnson Cocke (1865–1944), writer and civic leader
- Margaret Wootten Collier (1869–1947), author
- Elizabeth Brownrigg Henderson Cotten (1875–1975), socialite, suffragist, and librarian
- Sallie Southall Cotten (1846–1929), writer and clubwoman
- Cola Barr Craig (1861–1930), president, U.D.C.; author and clubwoman
- Pauline Smith Crenshaw (1878–1956), historian, co-founder and president of the Montgomery Museum of Fine Arts
- Emma Guy Cromwell (1865–1952), Kentucky State Treasurer and Kentucky Secretary of State
- Nelma Crutcher (1950–2022), President General of the United Daughters of the Confederacy
- Addie Worth Bagley Daniels (1869–1943), suffragist, writer, and socialite
- Kate Embry Dowdle Davis (1871–1954), President National of the U.S. Daughters of 1812
- Rachel Darden Davis (1905–1979), physician and member of the North Carolina House of Representatives
- Mabel Sessions Dennis (1895–1990), UDC President General, editor and co-publisher of The Covington News
- Elizabeth Caroline Dowdell (1829–1909), secretary, U.D.C.; ideator, Woman's Missionary Society of the Methodist Episcopal Church, South
- Mary Ann Cobb Erwin (1850–1930), originator of the Southern Cross of Honor
- Amanda Julia Estill (1882–1965), writer, teacher, folklorist
- Rebecca Latimer Felton (1835–1930), U.S. Senator from Georgia
- Sarah E. Gabbett (1833–1911), medal designer and first Custodian of the Southern Cross of Honor
- Sarah Ewing Sims Carter Gaut (1826–1912), socialite and Confederate spy
- Caroline Meriwether Goodlett (1833–1914), founding president of the UDC
- Estelle Avinger Haggard (1884–1977), UDC President General
- Ethel Hillyer Harris (1859–1931), author
- Laura Montgomery Henderson (1867–1940), First Lady of Alabama and president of the Alabama Federation of Women's Clubs
- Lizzie George Henderson (1863–1937), UDC President General
- Mary Ferrand Henderson (1887–1965), suffragist and Democratic party leader
- Una B. Herrick (1863–1950), American educator, the first Dean of Women at Montana State College.
- Mary Hilliard Hinton (1869–1961), historian, painter, anti-suffragist, and white supremacist
- Willie Kavanaugh Hocker (1862–1944), teacher and designer of the Arkansas state flag
- Margaret Gardner Hoey (1875–1942), First Lady of North Carolina
- Ella Virginia Houck Holloway (1862–1940), President National of the U.S. Daughters of 1812
- Vernettie O. Ivy (1876–1967), politician and member of the Arizona House of Representatives
- Mary Woodson Jarvis (1842–1924), First Lady of North Carolina
- Birdie Robertson Johnson (1868–1926), suffragist and Texas Division UDC president
- Kitty O'Brien Joyner (1916–1993), electrical engineer and the first woman engineer at NACA, the predecessor to NASA.
- Dorothy Blount Lamar, historian and activist
- Cecile Brawley Long (1900–1983), UDC President General
- Adele Briscoe Looscan (1848–1935), president of the Texas State Historical Association (1915–1925).
- Annie Guinn Massey (1872–1948), UDC President General
- Lena B. Mathes (1861–1951), educator, social reformer, and ordained Baptist minister
- Gertrude Dills McKee (1885–1948), politician and first woman elected to the North Carolina State Senate
- May Faris McKinney (1874–1959), President-General, UDC
- Virginia Faulkner McSherry (1845–1916), President-General, UDC
- Corinne Melchers (1880–1955), painter, humanitarian, and gardener
- Jeannie Blackburn Moran (1842/50–1929), author, community leader, and socialite
- Katie Cabell Currie Muse (1861–1927), UDC President General
- Lula C. Naff (1875–1960), General manager of the Ryman Auditorium
- Florence Sillers Ogden (1891–1971), newspaper columnist, Jackson Clarion-Ledger, pro-segregation activist.
- Elizabeth Fry Page (?–1943), author, editor
- Eliza Hall Nutt Parsley (1842–1920), founder and president of the North Carolina Division & Cape Fear Chapter of the UDC
- E. Jean Nelson Penfield (1872–1961), co-founder, League of Women Voters; National President, Kappa Kappa Gamma
- Emeline Piggott (1836–1919), Confederate spy
- Helen Plane (1829–1925), Organizer of the Confederate Memorial Carving at Stone Mountain
- Loula Roberts Platt (1863–1934), suffragist and first woman to run for a seat in the North Carolina Senate
- Edith D. Pope (1869–1947), second editor of the Confederate Veteran; president of the Nashville No. 1 chapter of the UDC from 1927 to 1930.
- Eugenia Dunlap Potts (1840–1912), writer
- Anna Davenport Raines (1853–1915), founding vice-president of the UDC
- Mattie Clyburn Rice (1922–2014), second African American to be recognized as a "Real Daughter of the Confederacy"
- Lucy Henderson Owen Robertson (1850–1930), academic and the first woman president of a college in the Southern United States
- Grace Taylor Rodenbough (1897–1967), member of the North Carolina House of Representatives
- Laura Martin Rose (1862–1917), historian and propagandist for the Ku Klux Klan
- Letitia Dowdell Ross (1866–1952), president, Alabama Division, UDC
- Mildred Lewis Rutherford (1851–1928), educator, writer, and White Supremacist activist
- Leonora St. George Rogers Schuyler (1868–1952), UDC President General
- Jennie Hart Sibley (1846–1917), president, Georgia WCTU; president, UDC for Greene County
- Daisy McLaurin Stevens (1875–1950), UDC President General
- Cornelia Branch Stone (1840–1925), president-general, UDC; president, Texas Woman's Press Association
- Beulah Winn Stunston (1880–1959), civic leader and Kentucky Division UDC president
- May Erwin Talmadge (1885–1973), 19th President General of the Daughters of the American Revolution
- Benedette Moore Tobin (1849–1901), President of the UDC's Texas State Division
- Rosa Lee Tucker (1866–1946), State Librarian of Mississippi
- Panthea Twitty (1912–1977), photographer, ceramicist, and historian.
- Sallie Duke Drake Twitty (1835–1923), schoolteacher and principal
- Rosa Kershaw Walker (1840s–1909), author, journalist, editor
- Almyra Maynard Watson (1917–2018), officer in the United States Army Nurse Corps
- Fay Webb-Gardner (1885–1969), First Lady of North Carolina
- Jeanne Fox Weinmann (1874–1962), UDC president general, 8th president national of the U.S. Daughters of 1812
- Minnie Welch (1871–1962), President, Tennessee WCTU
- Rassie Hoskins White (1862–1944), UDC President General
- Jane Renwick Smedburg Wilkes (1827–1913), nurse and hospital foundress
- Juliet Marshall Blackburn Williams (1857–1928), civic leader
- Margaret O'Connor Wilson (1856–1942), civic leader
- Angelina Virginia Winkler (1842–1911), journalist and publisher
- Kathryn Slaughter Wittichen (1896–1985), UDC president general, founder of Southern Dames of America, president of Miami Women's Club
- Rosa Louise Woodberry (1869–1932), educator, journalist, and stenographer
- Josephine McDonald Yarbrough (1879–1961), writer and clubwoman
- Marie Hirst Yochim, lineage society leader

== Fictional members ==
- Blanche Devereaux (portrayed by Rue McClanahan), a fictional character in the American sitcom The Golden Girls
