= List of hereditary and lineage organizations in the United States =

This is a list of notable hereditary and lineage organizations, and is informed by the database of the Hereditary Society Community of the United States of America. It includes societies that limit their membership to those who meet group inclusion criteria, such as descendants of a particular person or group of people of historical importance. It does not include general ethnic heritage societies.

== A ==
- Ancient and Honorable Artillery Company of Massachusetts
- Aztec Club of 1847
- Associated Daughters of Early American Witches
- Association Royale des Descendants des Lignages de Bruxelles (lit. 'Royal Association of the Descendants of the Lineages of Brussels')

== B ==
- Bloodlines of Salem

== C ==
- Children of the American Revolution
- Children of the Confederacy
- Cleveland Grays
- The Colonial Dames of America
- The Colonial Dames XVII Century
- Continental Society Daughters of Indian Wars

== D ==
- Dames of the Court of Honor
- Daughters of 98'
- Daughters of the British Empire
- Daughters of Hawaii
- Daughters of the American Revolution
- Daughters of the Cincinnati
- Daughters of the Republic of Texas
- Daughters of Union Veterans of the Civil War, 1861-1865

== F ==
- Flagon and Trencher

== G ==
- General Society of Colonial Wars
- General Society Daughters of the Revolution 1776
- General Society of Mayflower Descendants
- General Society of the War of 1812
- General Society Sons of the Revolution

== H ==
- Hereditary Order of Descendants of Colonial Governors
- Hereditary Order of the First Families of Connecticut
- Holland Society of New York
- The Huguenot Society of America

== I ==
- International Society Daughters of Utah Pioneers

== J ==
- Jamestowne Society
- Job's Daughters International
- John More Association

== L ==
- Ladies of the Grand Army of the Republic
- Legion of Valor of the United States of America

== M ==
- The Mayflower Society
- Military Order of Foreign Wars of the United States
- Military Order of the Carabao
- Military Order of the Loyal Legion of the United States
- Military Order of the Stars and Bars
- Monticello Association

== N ==
- National Society Children of the American Colonists
- National Society of the Colonial Dames of America
- National Society Daughters of the American Colonists
- National Society Daughters of Colonial Wars
- National Society of Daughters of Founders and Patriots of America
- National Society Daughters of the Union 1861-1865
- National Society Descendants of American Farmers
- National Society of New England Women
- National Society of Sons of Utah Pioneers
- National Society United States Daughters of 1812
- Naval Order of the United States
- New England Society in the City of New York

== O ==
- Order of Daedalians
- Order of the First Families of Virginia
- Order of Lafayette
- Order of the Founders and Patriots of America
- Order of the Indian Wars of the United States

== P ==
- Pioneers of Alaska
- Poindexter Descendants Association (incl: Poingdestre, Pendexter, Puddister)

== R ==
- Russian Nobility Association in America

== S ==
- Saint Nicholas Society of the City of New York
- Society of California Pioneers
- Society of Colonial Wars
- Society of the Cincinnati
- The Society of Daughters of Holland Dames
- Society of Descendants of the Conquest
- Society of Descendants of Ireland
- Society of Descendants of the Latin Kingdom of Jerusalem
- Society of the Descendants of the Schwenkfeldian Exiles
- Society of the Descendants of the Founders of Hartford
- Society of Descendants of Scotland
- Society of Indiana Pioneers
- Society of Presidential Descendants
- Sons and Daughters of Oregon Pioneers
- Sons and Daughters of the Vietnam War
- Sons of the Revolution
- Sons of the American Legion
- Sons of the American Revolution
- Sons of Confederate Veterans
- Sons of Union Veterans of the Civil War
- Sons of Spanish-American War Veterans
- Sons of the Republic of Texas
- Sons of Utah Pioneers
- Southern Dames of America
- Swedish Colonial Society

== U ==
- Union des Descendants des Commandeurs Hereditaires et Chevaliers du Grand Prieure Russe de l'Ordre de St Jean de Jerusalem
- United Daughters of the Confederacy
- United Empire Loyalist Association of Canada

== W ==
- Winthrop Society
- Willard Family Association of America
- Wing Family of America, Inc

== See also ==
- Family history society
- List of historical societies in the United States
