= East Dover, Vermont =

- Village
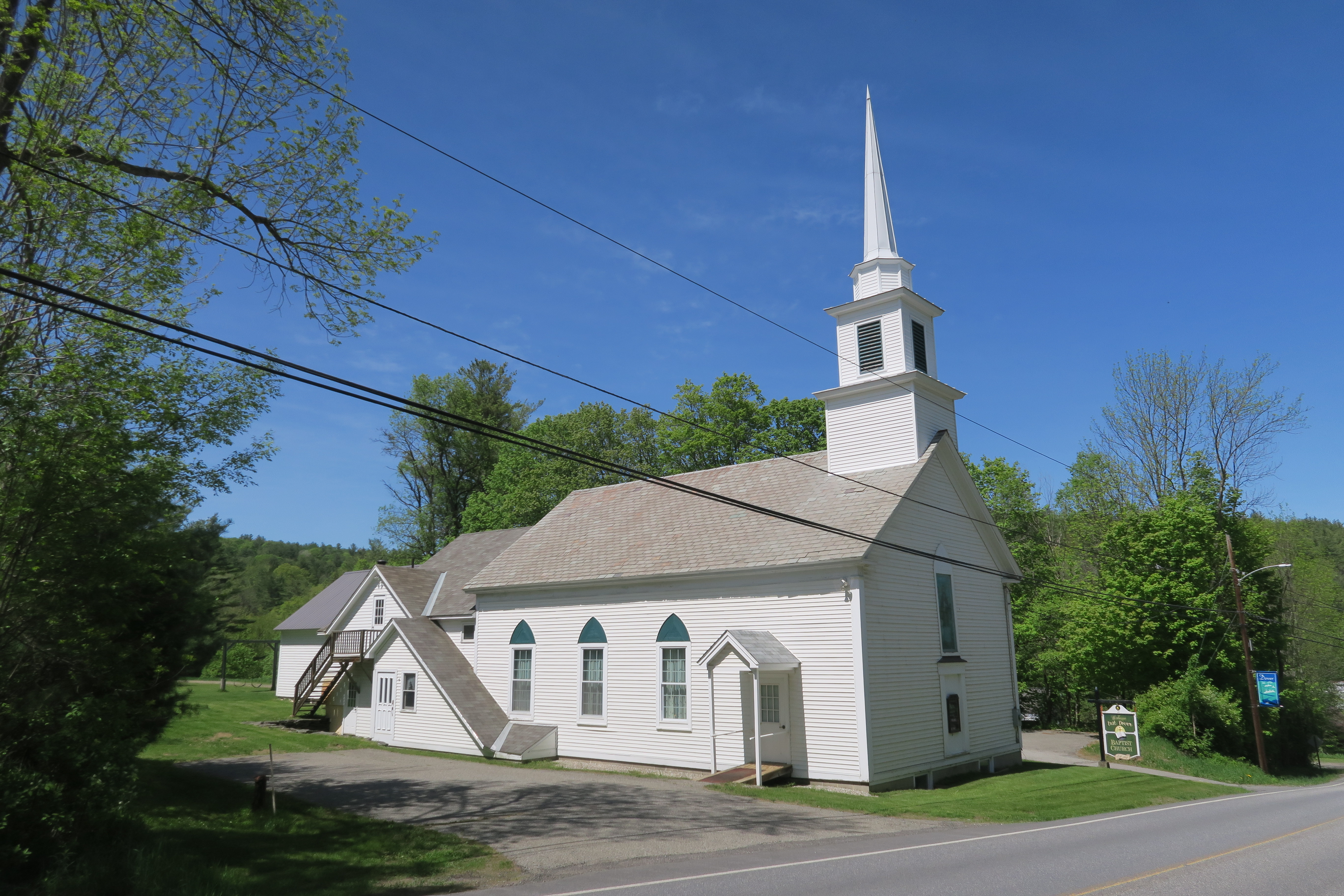
- East Dover Baptist Church

- Location within Vermont
- Coordinates: 42°57′04″N 72°46′08″W
- Country: United States
- State: Vermont
- County: Windham
- Elevation: 1,119 ft (341 m)
- Time zone: UTC-5 (Eastern (EST))
  - Summer (DST): UTC-4 (EDT)
- ZIP code: 05341
- Area code: 802
- GNIS feature ID: 1460825

East Dover is an unincorporated village in the town of Dover, Windham County, Vermont, United States. The community is 6.2 miles (10.0 km) west-southwest of the village of Newfane. East Dover has a post office with ZIP code 05341.

== Notable people ==
- Ida Sherman Jenne (1860–1934), President National of the U.S. Daughters of 1812
