= Arkansas Historical Association =

Arkansas Historical Association logo

The Arkansas Historical Association is a historical society based at the University of Arkansas in Fayetteville, Arkansas.

The association has hosted an annual conference on Arkansas history at varying locations throughout the state since 1946. It also publishes a quarterly academic journal and a bi-annual newsletter.

== History ==
The association was founded at the Marion Hotel in Little Rock on February 22, 1941, by prominent Arkansas citizens and scholars. Its mission upon establishment was “to promote interest in the history of Arkansas, to locate, collect, and preserve historical material, and to publish scarce and important source material, and also historical articles, news, and notes”. J.H. Reynolds was elected as the first president. The publication of an academic journal was named the first task of the association, and in March 1942, the first issue of The Arkansas Historical Quarterly was published. Although the association had planned annual meetings at its initial founding, no meeting was held until five years thereafter due to the involvement of the United States in the Second World War. Collection of membership fees and the publication of the Quarterly continued, however.

The first meeting since the association's founding was held April 26–27, 1946 in the Pioneers Room of the Old State House in Little Rock. Annual conferences have since been held in locations throughout the state of Arkansas, including Fort Smith, Fayetteville, Jonesboro, and Conway.

== Current officers ==
(As of 2013)

- President: Timothy G. Nutt
- Vice President: Joseph Key
- Secretary Treasurer: Patrick G. Williams

The presidents of the association are elected on a biennial basis and may serve a maximum of two terms.

== Notable former officers ==
- Jeanne Fox Weinmann, president national of the U.S. Daughters of 1812 and president general of the United Daughters of the Confederacy
- Dallas T. Herndon
- J. William Fulbright

== See also ==
- List of historical societies in Arkansas
