= Southern Dames of America =

American lineage society

- Abbreviation: SDA or NSSDA
- Established: November 1962; 64 years ago
- Founders: Kathryn Slaughter Wittichen
- Founded at: Atlanta, Georgia, U.S.
- Type: lineage society, charity
- National President: Patricia E. Gallagher
- Publication: The Journal
- Website: sda1962.org

The National Society Southern Dames of America (often abbreviated as SDA or NSSDA) is an American lineage society, hereditary association, and charitable organization for women of Southern heritage that supports ophthalmic research and promotes patriotic, educational, and benevolent endeavors. The society built and maintains the Helen Keller Memorial Gazebo at Ivy Green, the birthplace and childhood home of Helen Keller in Tuscumbia, Alabama.

== History ==
The National Society Southern Dames of America was established in November 1962. The inaugural national assembly was held at the Atlanta Biltmore Hotel in Atlanta between June 2 and June 6, 1963. The chartering officers of the national society were Kathryn Slaughter Wittichen, honorary president and founder; Doris Walker Lyle, national president; Ms. Henry Frost Chadeayne, national vice president at large; Mrs. Allen D. O'Brian, national secretary; Mrs. Richard B. Redwood, national treasurer; Mrs. Thomas W. Huey, national historian; and Mrs. George T. Winn, national chaplain. The name "Southern Dames" was suggested by charter member Adylise Sherrod Grimsley of Fayette, Alabama.

The national society's dedication ceremonies took place on June 2, 1963 at St. Mark United Methodist Church on Peachtree Street. On June 3, 1963, the national society held a dedication of Southern flags at the summit of Stone Mountain, followed by a tea party at the Stone Mountain Plantation House, where an eye bank committee was formed to assist members in donating their eyes and the membership committee decided that membership in the society would be by invitation-only to women who were sponsored by other members and were "high caliber, aristocratic, or worthy dames of the South." "This Is My Country" was chosen as the official song of the national society.

The second national assembly was held at the Willard Hotel in Washington, D.C. from April 22 to April 26, 1964. During this assembly, Helen Keller was made an honorary member of the organization.

In January 1965, the Georgia Society of the Southern Dames of America held a luncheon at the Capital City Club in Atlanta, where national vice president Mrs. Hiram Mozley discussed plans for the national society's European tour. The national president, Mrs. Lee H. Lyle, was also in attendance and gave updates on two of the national society's major projects, the Thomas Jefferson Political Science and History Award and the Eye Bank Program.

The Southern Dames chartered their Arkansas state society on July 10, 2021 in North Little Rock, Arkansas.

== Objectives ==
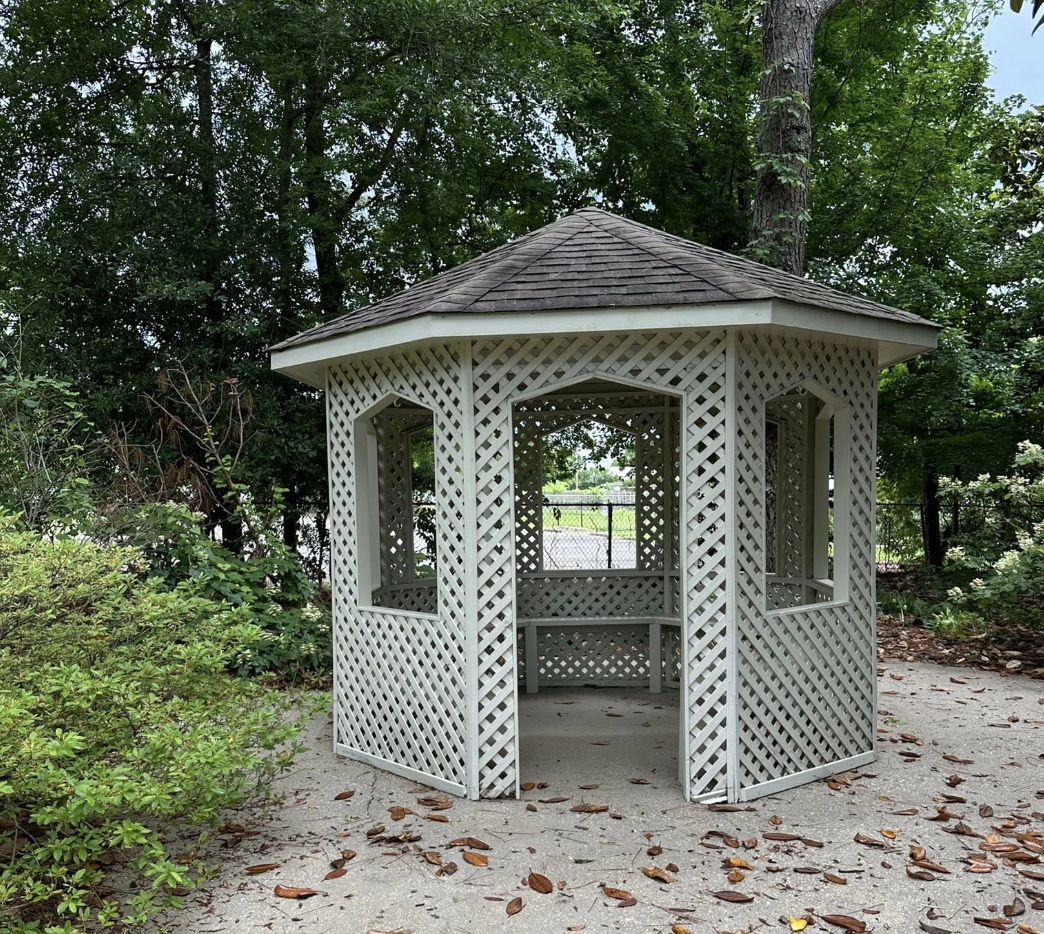
The SDA Helen Keller Memorial Gazebo at Ivy Green

The society's main goals are to support ophthalmic research, support eye health initiatives, fund scholarships, and promote patriotic, artistic, literary, educational, and benevolent endeavors. Members of the society financially support various eye care centers, hospitals, and schools for the blind.

In 1964, the society adopted an abandoned chapel at Stone Mountain as their fundraising project.

On May 10, 1981, the Southern Dames dedicated the Helen Keller Memorial Gazebo at Ivy Green, a cotton plantation in Tuscumbia, Alabama, that was the birthplace and childhood home of Helen Keller, who was an honorary member of the society. A historic marker was unveiled at the gazebo by National President Margaret Boatright. The Southern Dames continues to provide funds for maintenance of the gazebo at Ivy Green.

In 2013, the Southern Dames Pinehurst Chapter in North Carolina donated over 200 pairs of glasses to the Eye Bank and donated $900 to South Eastern Guide Dogs, the Martha Frank Fragrance Garden, the Blinded Veterans Association, the Governor Morehead School, and the Library for the Blind.

== Membership ==
Membership in the Southern Dames of America, by invitation only, is for women whose families helped shape the cultural, civic, and historical landscape of the American South.

=== Notable members ===
- Dianne Cannestra, President National of the U.S. Daughters of 1812
- Julie Noegel Hardaway, President General of the United Daughters of the Confederacy
- Anne Winship Bates Leach, socialite, heiress, and philanthropist
- Virginie de Pusy Lafayette, French aristocrat
- Alice Schroeder, financial journalist and author
- Cher Sesma, President National of the U.S. Daughters of 1812, Governor General of the Continental Society Daughters of Indian Wars
- Sheryl Sims, quilter and arts commissioner
- Ginnie Sebastian Storage, 47th President General of the Daughters of the American Revolution
- Kathryn Slaughter Wittichen, founder of Southern Dames of America, President General of the United Daughters of the Confederacy, and President of the Miami Women's Club
- Pamela Rouse Wright, 46th President General of the Daughters of the American Revolution

==== Honorary members ====
- Virginia Hollis Hand Callaway, founder of Callaway Gardens
- Helen Keller, author, disability rights advocate, and political activist
- Jean MacArthur, wife of General Douglas MacArthur
- Bernice Brown McCullar, educator, historian, and columnist

=== List of national presidents ===
The presidents of the National Society Southern Dames of America have been:

| Number | President | Years in office | State of membership |
|---|---|---|---|
| 1 | Kathryn Slaughter Wittichen (Mrs. Murray F.) | 1962–1963 | Florida |
| 2 | Doris Walker Lyle (Mrs. Lee H.) | 1963–1966 | Georgia |
| 3 | Winifred Simpson Yarrington (Mrs. R. Grayson) | 1968–1970 | Maryland |
| 4 | Emily Vance (Mrs. Herbert O.) | 1970–1972 | Florida |
| 5 | Lillian Everhart (Mrs. Edgar Jr.) | 1972–1974 | Georgia |
| 6 | Kathleen Plaster (Mrs. Dan Sr.) | 1974–1976 | Florida |
| 7 | Martha Jo Wallace (Mrs. William G.) | 1978–1980 | Florida |
| 8 | Margaret Boatright (Mrs. L. T. Jr.) | 1980–1982 | New Mexico |
| 9 | Melva M. Koonce (Mrs. James A.) | 1982–1984 | Alabama |
| 10 | Kay Milton (Mrs. John) | 1984–1986 | Florida |
| 11 | Ann Seay Briglia (Mrs. Arnold E.) | 1986–1988 | Alabama |
| 12 | Fritzi K. Martin (Mrs. Jack L.) | 1988–1990 | Louisiana |
| 13 | Hannah Jones (Mrs. Richard M.) | 1990–1992 | Florida |
| 14 | Anne B. Bradford | 1992–1994 | Tennessee |
| 15 | Shirley Spuhler (Mrs. Shelby) | 1994–1996 | Texas |
| 16 | Carolyn N. Godwin | 1996–1998 | Alabama |
| 17 | Polly Hutson (Mrs. William H.) | 1998–2000 | Florida |
| 18 | Frances W. Hawkins (Mrs. D.S.) | 2000–2002 | Maryland |
| 19 | Catherine F. Brister | 2002–2004 | Florida |
| 20 | Carolee P. McKinstry (Mrs. Sam W.) | 2004–2006 | Tennessee |
| 21 | Mary F. Rever (Mrs. William B. Jr.) | 2006–2008 | Maryland |
| 22 | Nelly G. Shearer (Mrs. William O.) | 2008–2010 | Tennessee |
| 23 | Dorothy Lee | 2010–2012 | Louisiana |
| 24 | Robin R. Towns (Mrs. Robert) | 2012–2014 | Georgia |
| 25 | L. Sue Comerford (Mrs. Richard J. Jr.) | 2014–2016 | Florida |
| 26 | Gabrielle "Gaby" Hadyka (Mrs. Joseph) | 2016–2018 | Texas |
| 27 | Camille Lowery (Mrs. Clifford) | 2018–2018 Died in office | Georgia |
| 28 | Brenda Hamilton | 2018–2020 | North Carolina |
| 29 | Bonnell "Bonnie" Wheeler Lashley | 2020–2022 | Georgia |
| 30 | Melissa Harrison Fisher | 2022–2024 | Maryland |
| 31 | Jessieanne Wells | 2024–2026 | Kentucky |
| 32 | Patricia E. Gallagher | 2026–present | Georgia |

== See also ==
- Colonial Dames of America
- National Society of the Colonial Dames of America
- National Society Colonial Dames XVII Century
- National Society of New England Women
- Society of Daughters of Holland Dames
- United Daughters of the Confederacy
