= Ida Sherman Jenne =

American clubwoman

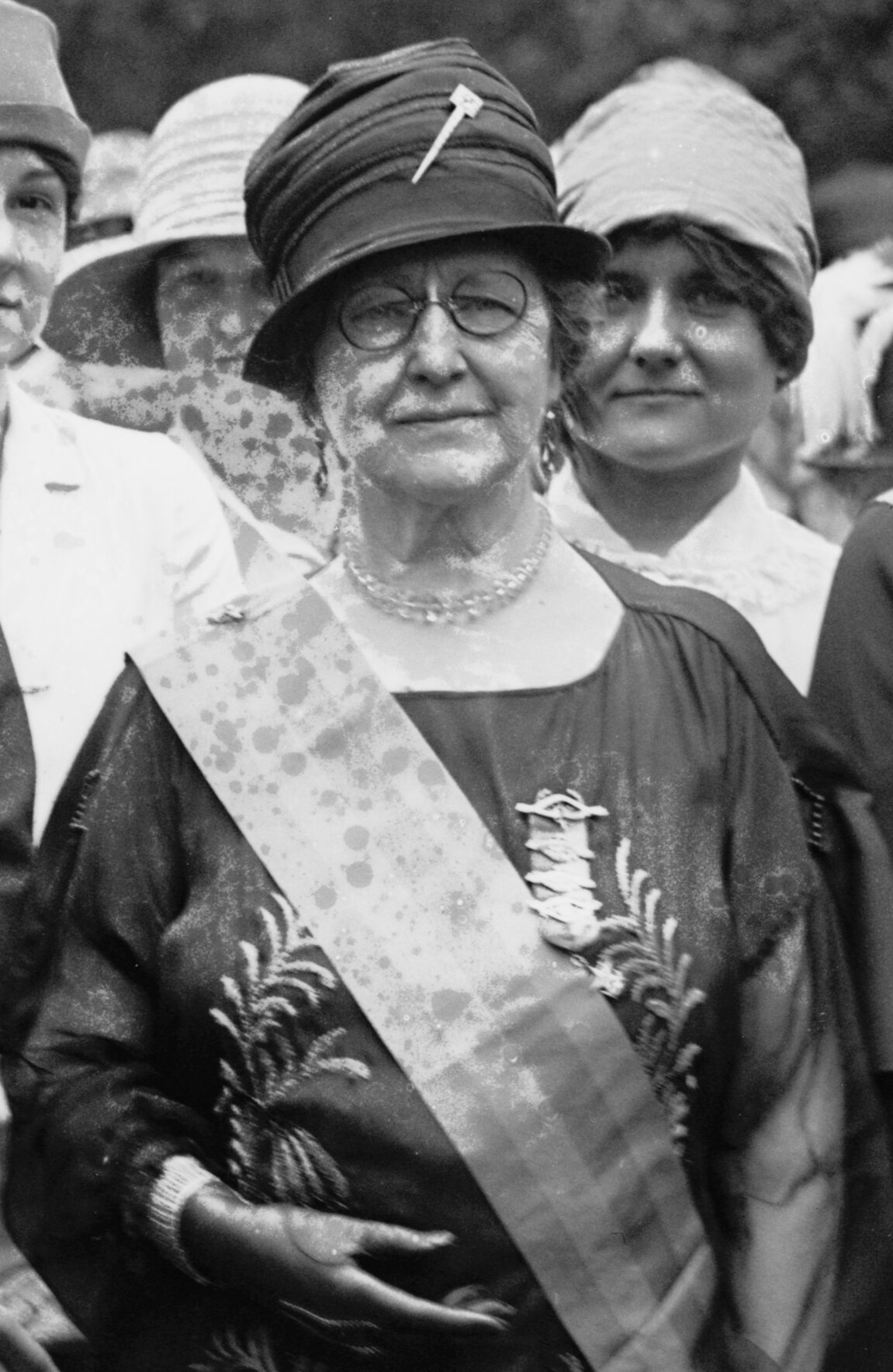
- Jenne at the White House in 1927

President National, U.S. Daughters of 1812
- In office 1918–1923

Personal details
- Born: Ida May Sherman; May 1, 1860 East Dover, Vermont, U.S.
- Died: January 30, 1934 (aged 73) Hartford, Connecticut, U.S.
- Resting place: Prospect Hill Cemetery
- Spouse: Clarence F. R. Jenne

Ida May Sherman Jenne (May 1, 1860 – January 30, 1934), also known as Mrs. Clarence F. R. Jenne, was an American socialite and philanthropist who served as president national of the National Society of United States Daughters of 1812.

== Early life and family ==
Jenne was born Ida May Sherman on May 1, 1860, in East Dover, Vermont. She was a descendant of Captain John Sherman.

== Clubs and philanthropy ==
Jenne was a member of the National Society of the Colonial Dames of America, the Daughters of the American Colonists, the Daughters of the American Revolution, and the United States Daughters of 1812. She served as Connecticut State Regent of the Daughters of the American Colonists. As a member of the Brattleboro Chapter of the Daughters of the American Revolution, she served on a committee that arranged the placing of a historical marker at the Old Courthouse in Westminster, Vermont.

In 1922, she served on the Women's Emergency Committee for Near East Relief to aid starving children in the Near East.

=== U.S. Daughters of 1812 ===
In 1918, Jenne was elected as President National of the United States Daughters of 1812. She collected funds in order to procure documents from archives in Ottawa to create a list of American prisoners in the War of 1812, which she presented to the Navy Department Library at the Washington Navy Yard. She was re-elected to a second term as president national on April 27, 1921, during the national society's annual session in Washington, D.C.

As Honorary President National of the United States Daughters of 1812, she and President National Kate Embry Dowdle Davis visited President Calvin Coolidge at the White House.

== Personal life ==
Jenne lived in Hartford, Connecticut. She was married to Clarence Freemont Reuben Jenne.

She frequently corresponded with the Edwards family in Oklahoma.
