= Maud Callaway Hays =

American clubwoman (born 1906)

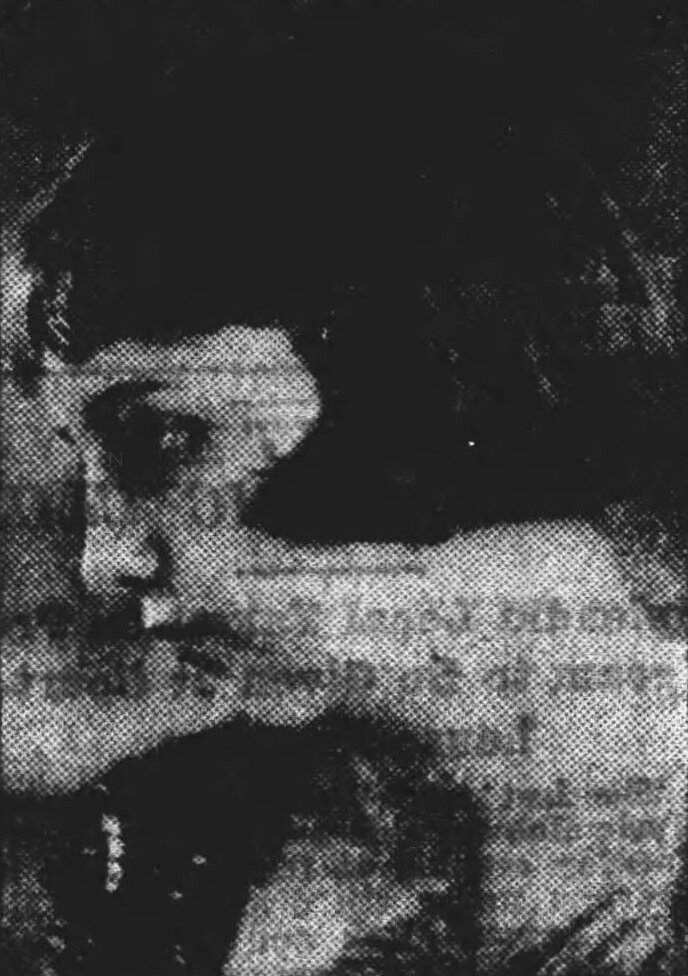
- Portrait of Hays in 1924

President National, U.S. Daughters of 1812

Personal details
- Born: Maud Angie Callaway; June 4, 1906 Chattanooga, Tennessee, U.S.
- Spouse: Cecil Theodore Hays (m. 1925)
- Children: 2
- Education: Maryville College; University of Chattanooga
- Occupation: clubwoman genealogist

Maud Angie Callaway Hays (born June 4, 1906) was an American clubwoman and genealogist who served as President National of the National Society of United States Daughters of 1812.

== Early life ==
Hays was born as Maud Angie Callaway on June 4, 1906, in Chattanooga, Tennessee, to Elnora (née Koons) and William Claud Callaway. She graduated from Maryville College in 1924. She also attended the University of Chattanooga.

== Lineage societies ==
She was a member of the Mission chapter of the National Society Colonial Dames XVII Century in Texas. She served as the Colonial Dames XVII Century's Tennessee Organizing President and State Organizing Secretary.

She was a member of the The Huguenot Society of America and served as a delegate at the Huguenot Congress in Washington, D.C. in 1963.

Hays served as President National of the United States Daughters of 1812. In 1969, she attended the Daughters of 1812 Texas State Council at the Hotel America in Houston, Texas. During the council, she was the principal speaker at a Dolley Madison luncheon.

Hays was a genealogist and wrote two books, including The Hays Family and Roberts and Allied Families in 1952.

== Personal life ==
She married Cecil Theodore Hays on September 28, 1925. They had two children, Ted Cecil and Don Callaway. She lived on Dodds Avenue in Chattanooga. She was an antique collector and had a collection of little pitchers. In 1960, according to The Chattanooga Times, she had the world's largest collection of liberty bell glass, pressed glass from the Centennial Exposition.

== Legacy ==
In 1962, the Maud Callaway Hays Scholarship Fund was established East Tennessee State University (then the East Tennessee State Teachers College) in honor of her work with the Colonial Dames in Tennessee.
