= Cher Sesma =

American lineage society leader

President National of the U.S. Daughters of 1812
- Incumbent
- Assumed office 2024
- Preceded by: Dianne Cannestra

California State President, Colonial Dames XVII Century
- In office 2013–2015
- Preceded by: Diana Robertson
- Succeeded by: Joanne Murphy

Cher Sesma is an American clubwoman who currently serves as the president national of the National Society of United States Daughters of 1812.

== Lineage societies ==
Sesma is a member of the Southern Dames of America. She served as Governor of the First California Company of the Jamestowne Society from 2006 to 2008. She served as California State President of the National Society Colonial Dames XVII Century from 2013 to 2015. She served as 1st Deputy Governor and later as Governor General of the Continental Society Daughters of Indian Wars.

In February 2025, she was the special guest at the 111th Arkansas State Council meeting of the U.S. Daughters of 1812 at Pine Bluff Country Club in Pine Bluff, Arkansas. On April 3, 2026, she presented the Spirit of 1812 Medal to author and maritime historian Donald G. Shomette during the 134th Associate Council national conference in Washington, D.C.
