= Clara L. Brown Dyer =

American painter (1849–1931)

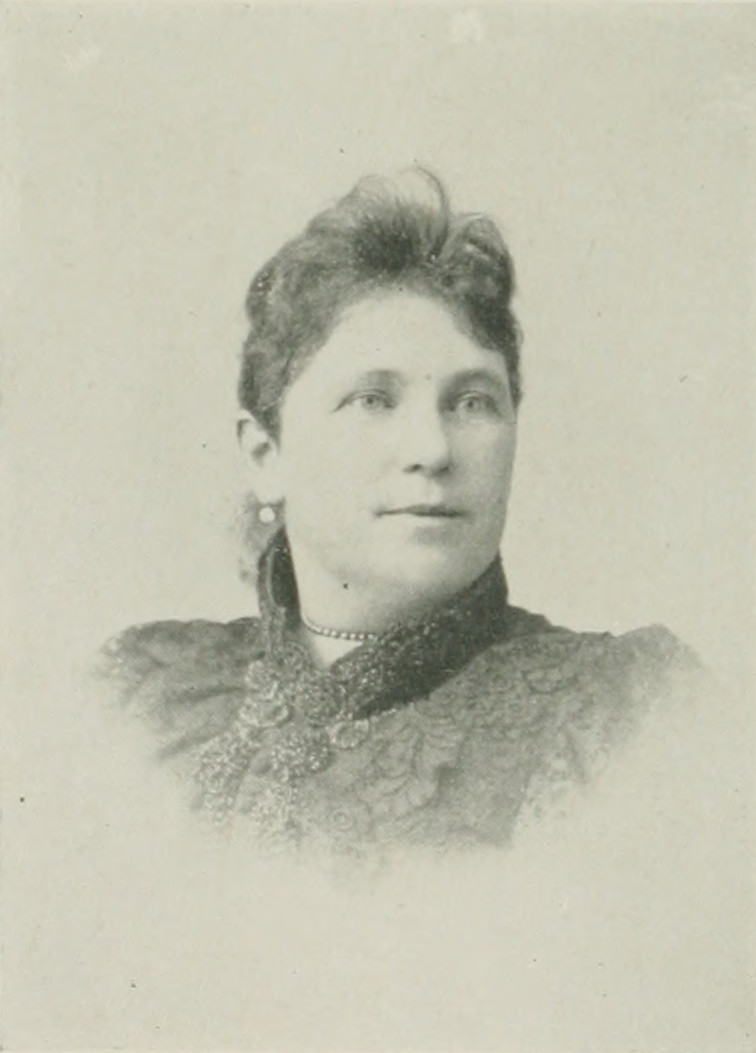
- Clara L. Brown Dyer, "A woman of the century"

Vice President National, U.S. Daughters of 1812

Personal details
- Born: Clara L. Brown; March 13, 1849 Cape Elizabeth, Maine, U.S.
- Died: March 2, 1931 (aged 81)
- Spouse(s): Charles A. Dyer; Jerry Foster
- Children: 2
- Occupation: painter lecturer clubwoman

Clara L. Brown Dyer (March 13, 1849 – March 2, 1931) was an American artist who specialized in landscape painting. Also a reader and speaker, she was prominent in clubs and the social scenes of Maine, including being the organizer and president of the Maine branch of United States Daughters of 1812.

== Family ==
Clara L. Brown was born on March 13, 1849, in Cape Elizabeth, Maine. She was the daughter of Captain Peter Weare and Lucy A. (Jones) Brown. Her father, who was born February 11, 1818, son of Jacob and Lucy (Pierce) Brown, was a master mariner, and spent a great part of his life at sea, often accompanied by his daughter. Jacob Brown, Dyer's paternal grandfather, was son of Lieutenant Peter Weare Brown and his wife, Eunice Braun, grandson of Major Jacob, Jr., and Lydia (Weare) Brown, and great-grandson of Jacob Brown, Sr., and his wife Mary.

Major Jacob Brown, Jr., of North Yarmouth, Maine, served in the American Revolutionary War in Colonel Edmund Phinney's regiment (Thirty-first) in 1775 and 1776, entering service April 24, 1775. His name appears in a list of officers recommended by the Council, October 6, 1757, to be commissioned by General George Washington. Later, he was First Major, Colonel Jonathan Mitchell's (Cumberland County) regiment, July 6, 1777, to September 25, 1779, expedition against Penobscot. He married July 13, 1743, Lydia, daughter of Captain Peter and Sarah (Felt) Weare.

Peter Weare Brown, Sr., was a private in Captain John Worthley's company. Colonel K. Phinney's regiment, May 8, 1775, to July 6, 1775; early in 1770 was Ensign in Captain Nathan Walker's company; promoted to Second Lieutenant, April 15, 1776, and served until December 31, 1776. He enlisted July 1, 1778, in Captain Benjamin Lemont's company, Colonel Nathaniel Wade's regiment, and served six months and twelve days in Rhode Island. He died February 28, 1830.

Dyer's mother, Lucy Jones Brown, was born November 25, 1822, daughter of Cyrus and Rebecca (Tyler) Jones. During the War of 1812, Cyrus Jones, Dyer's maternal grandfather, helped to defend Portland, Maine. He also carried a load of specie in a four-ox team in the winter time from Portland to Canada for the government. On September 2, 1817, he was commissioned by Governor John Brooks, Captain of a company in the Third Regiment of Infantry, First Brigade, Twelfth Division, of the militia of Massachusetts. His grandson, Cyrus Jones Brown, brother of Dyer, served twenty months in the United States Navy in the American Civil War.

Rebecca Tyler, wife of Cyrus Jones and grandmother of Dyer, was born June 25, 1795. She was daughter of John Tyler, of Pownal, Maine, and his wife, Lucy Trickey, who belonged to one of the old families of York County. John Tyler, father of Rebecca, was son of Captain Abraham Tyler, of Scarborough, Maine, a Revolutionary soldier and pensioner.

Abraham Tyler raised his own company and marched in response to the Lexington Alarm, serving as Captain in the Eighteenth Continental Regiment during the siege of Boston and the Ticonderoga campaign of 1776, also in Colonel Thomas Poor's regiment, May 15, 1778, to February 17, 1779. His son, Abraham Tyler, Jr., enlisted in 1781 for three years in Captain John Brooks's company, Seventh Regiment.

James Tyler, father of Captain Abraham Tyler, is said to have come to Scarborough, from Cape Porpoise (Arundel) in 1718. James Tyler died in Scarborough in 1749. He was survived by his wife Phebe, sons Abraham and Royal, and two daughters. He is believed to have been the James Tyler who was born May 7, 1685, son of Moses and Prudence Tyler (town records, Andover, Massachusetts).

Moses Tyler, of Andover and Boxford (son of Jot)'), and Prudence Blake were married in July, 1666.

Job Tyler, father of Moses, was reputed to have been the first settler of Andover, Massachusetts. A monument erected to his memory in North Andover was dedicated by the Tyler Family Association in September, 1901.

Captain Abraham Tyler, of Scarborough, is said to have resided in Andover before the death of his father. He lived to the age of one hundred years. He held many public offices in Scarborough.

Several of her uncles were wood carvers and excelled in decorative work.

== Career ==
=== Artist ===
In 1880, Dyer took up the study of drawing and painting, in which arts she has risen to much prominence. A brief sketch of the results of the first years of her work appeared in A Woman of the Century. She was a most enthusiastic and persevering student, having taken a thorough course in an art school under able instructors from abroad. She paid considerable attention to portrait painting, but is seen at her best in landscapes. Some of these appeared on the walls of the Boston Art Club in four successive years. Her work was represented at all the exhibitions of the Portland Society of Art. One of her landscapes was thus mentioned: "The live, graceful treatment of the long ranks of willows, the shadowy foreground, contrasting with the airy, sunlighted middle distance, all suggest the great French master, Corot"; again, "The work is strong, showing almost a masculine touch." Of the three pictures that she exhibited at the Midwinter Fair in San Francisco, a critic said, "The man who painted these pictures knew his Inisiness." She made many fine sketches of the scenery about Casco Bay. She added to her collection some excellent sketches of mountain and inland scenery. Some of her studies, which were exhibited in Boston, Portland, and other cities, were highly praised by critics, as well as the general public.

She made many sketches while in the Sierras and Yosemite Valley. She devoted much time to teaching, being instructor of drawing and painting at Westbrook Seminary, Portland. Dyer passed the summer of 1902 in Europe, visiting the art galleries and the British Museum in London, the Louvre and Luxembourg in Paris, the Vatican in Rome, also galleries in Florence, Venice, Naples, Milan, Amsterdam, and the Hague. After her return, she produced from her sketches many interesting pictures of Venice and Holland.

Dyer was among the first members of the Society of Art and the Portland Art League. In 1890, she was elected a member of the executive and special committees. Much of her work was copied to illustrate art catalogues. She proved herself generous by giving paintings to increase by their sale the funds of needy societies.

=== Lecturer, reader ===
As Dyer was well drilled in elocution and in parliamentary usage, she became a power in the club work of Portland. She served as president of the Faneuil Club and also of the Mutual Improvement Club, and was a member of the Civic, Cresco, and Conklin Class. For two years, she was chair of the Schoolroom Decoration Committee, and while working in this line gave a lecture in "Across the Sierras to the Yosemite," which received favorable comments by the press, and added US$75 to the fund. As a member of the Literary Union, she took part in the exercises of two of the educational afternoons, one devoted to art, the other to travel, speaking, as she always did, entirely without notes. At the time of the Spanish–American War, she served on the executive committee of the Volunteer Aid Association, which did effectual work. In the year 1900, she was Vice-President at large of the Woman's Council.

In 1900, Dyer organized the National Society of United States Daughters of 1812, State of Maine, of which she served as President. She also was Vice-President of the National Society.

== Personal life ==
In December, 1870, she married Charles A. Dyer, then a successful merchant of Portland, Maine, who later engaged in gold-mining in California. He was the son of James and Lucy W. (Cushing) Dyer. Mr. Dyer's paternal grandfather, Paul Dyer, of Cape Elizabeth, was a soldier of the Revolutionary War. Mr. Dyer's mother died in 1899, aged ninety-five years. She was a daughter of Ezekiel and Thankful (Woodbury) Cushing and granddaughter of Colonel Ezekiel Cushing.

Mr. and Mrs. Dyer had a daughter who died young. There was one son, James Franklin Dyer. He was graduated from Brown University with the degree of A.B. in 1899, and then studied law at the New York Law School.

The Dyer home after their marriage was in Portland.

She married secondly, Jerry Foster, eventually becoming widowed. She died on March 2, 1931, having been sick for two years before.
