= General Society of the War of 1812 =

American patriotic organization

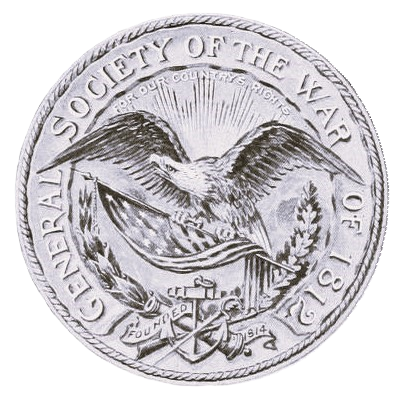
- Seal
- Named after: The War of 1812
- Established: September 14, 1814 (211 years ago)
- Founded at: Baltimore
- Merger of: The Society of the War of 1812 in the State of Maryland; The Society of the War of 1812 in the Commonwealth of Pennsylvania
- Type: 501(c)(3), patriotic organization
- Tax ID no.: 22-6042718
- Purpose: Memorialization, preservation, historical research and publication, benevolence, and patriotism
- Headquarters: Aberdeen, New Jersey
- Region served: United States
- Official language: English
- Main organ: Triennial Meeting
- Publication: The War Cry
- Affiliations: Daughters of 1812
- Website: gswar1812.org

The General Society of the War of 1812, commonly known as the Society of the War of 1812, is a patriotic organization headquartered in Aberdeen, New Jersey. It was organized in 1814 at Baltimore.

== History ==
=== Background ===
The Society of the War of 1812 in the State of Maryland was organized at Baltimore on September 14, 1814 (two days after the Battle of North Point), by veterans who had defeated Major-General Robert Ross's forces there.

The Society of the War of 1812 in the Commonwealth of Pennsylvania was organized at Philadelphia on January 9, 1854 (one day after the anniversary of the Battle of New Orleans), by a group of veterans who met in general convention at Independence Hall, having responded to a call issued by Joel B. Sutherland (himself a veteran and former member of Congress). Ostensibly called to draft resolutions pertaining to federal bounty land legislation, they acknowledged the need to organize at the national level for mutual support and to perpetuate the history of the War of 1812. They met again a year later in Washington, D.C., where they were received by President Franklin Pierce at the White House and lobbied Congress to secure the federal legislation, which was passed into law as the Bounty Land Act of 1855 on March 3, 1855.

=== Amalgamation ===
On April 14, 1894, the Maryland and the Pennsylvania societies met at Philadelphia to organize a general society. Being a federated society, they opted for the September 14, 1814, establishment date (the date the Maryland Society was first organized). The General Society has since increased to 33 State societies.

== Eligibility ==
The society admits men who are lineal descendants of American veterans who served on active federal duty during the War of 1812.

== Notable members ==
- Brigadier General Charles W. Abbot
- Brigadier General Charles Henry Alden
- Major General John R. Brooke
- Brevet Major Augustus P. Davis
- Admiral of the Navy George Dewey
- Rear Admiral John D. Ford
- Major General Adolphus W. Greely
- The Honorable Benjamin Harrison
- Brigadier General Tiemann N. Horn
- Major General Marshall I. Ludington
- The Honorable Martin O'Malley
- Major General Theodore S. Peck
- Brigadier General Edmund Rice
- Rear Admiral Francis Asbury Roe
- Brigadier General James M. J. Sanno
- The Honorable Joel B. Sutherland
- Major General Joseph Wheeler
- Brigadier General William S. Worth

== See also ==
- List of hereditary and lineage organizations in the United States
