= Dianne Cannestra =

American quilter and clubwoman

President National of the U.S. Daughters of 1812
- In office 2021–2024
- Succeeded by: Cher Sesma

Personal details
- Spouse: Kenneth W. Cannestra
- Children: 5
- Occupation: quilter clubwoman

Dianne Brown Cannestra is an American quilter and clubwoman who served as president national of the U.S. Daughters of 1812.

== Career ==
=== Historical and lineage societies ===
Cannestra is a member of the Colonial Dames of America, the Southern Dames of America, and the National Society Colonial Dames XVII Century, serving as Georgia State treasurer, first vice president, and state president of the latter.

She served as President National of the National Society of United States Daughters of 1812 from 2021 to 2024. As president national, she awarded Josh Ridley, a middle school history teacher from Monroe County, Georgia, with the national society's first national Outstanding Teacher of American History award in April 2024.

Cannestra is a member of the Daughters of the American Revolution and served as regent of the Martha Stewart Bulloch Chapter.

She also served as president of the Friends of Georgia Archives and History.

=== Quilting ===
Cannestra's began quilting in 2001. Her first quilt, completed in 2004, was titled Grandma Rosie's Garden, inspired by her grandmother, who loved to quilt. In 2016, she won the Bulloch Hall Quilt Guild's Guild Choice Award for her quilt, titled Star Crazy, that featured six hand-pieced pointed stars.

== Personal life ==
Cannestra is the daughter of Anne Brown. She is of Czech descent. Her grandmother was from Moravia. Cannestra also descends from Colonial Americans who lived in Delaware.

She lives in Atlanta, Georgia. She was married to Captain Kenneth William Cannestra, who died in 2019. She has five children.
