= National Society Descendants of American Farmers =

American lineage society

- Abbreviation: NSDOAF
- Established: March 10, 2019; 7 years ago
- Founders: Janisue Rigel; Davena Rigel Liepman; Geni Holmes; Cindy Broderick; Dianne Taylor Kibodeaux
- Founded at: The Woodlands, Texas, U.S.
- Type: lineage society
- President National: Renee Willingham Hamilton
- Website: nsdoaf.com

The National Society Descendants of American Farmers (often abbreviated as NSDOAF) is a lineage-based nonprofit organization that supports agricultural efforts in the United States.

== History ==
The National Society Descendants of American Farmers was founded in The Woodlands, Texas on March 10, 2019, by Janisue Rigel, Davena Rigel Liepman, Geni Holmes, Cindy Broderick, and Dianne Taylor Kibodeaux as a nonprofit, nonpolitical lineage society for descendants of American farmers who lived within the present boundaries of the contiguous continental United States between July 4, 1776 and July 4, 1914. Two years after its founding, the organization had over 1,000 members.

The national society honors, past, present, and future American farmers. The society present scholarships for higher education in agriculture.

== Notable members ==
- William Flynn Martin, energy economist, educator, international diplomat, and Special Assistant to Ronald Reagan
- Denise Doring VanBuren, 45th President General of the Daughters of the American Revolution
- Pamela Rouse Wright, 46th President General of the Daughters of the American Revolution
- Lynn Forney Young, 43rd President General of the Daughters of the American Revolution
