= United States Daughters of 1812, National Headquarters =

Historic house in Washington, D.C., United States

- U.S. National Register of Historic Places
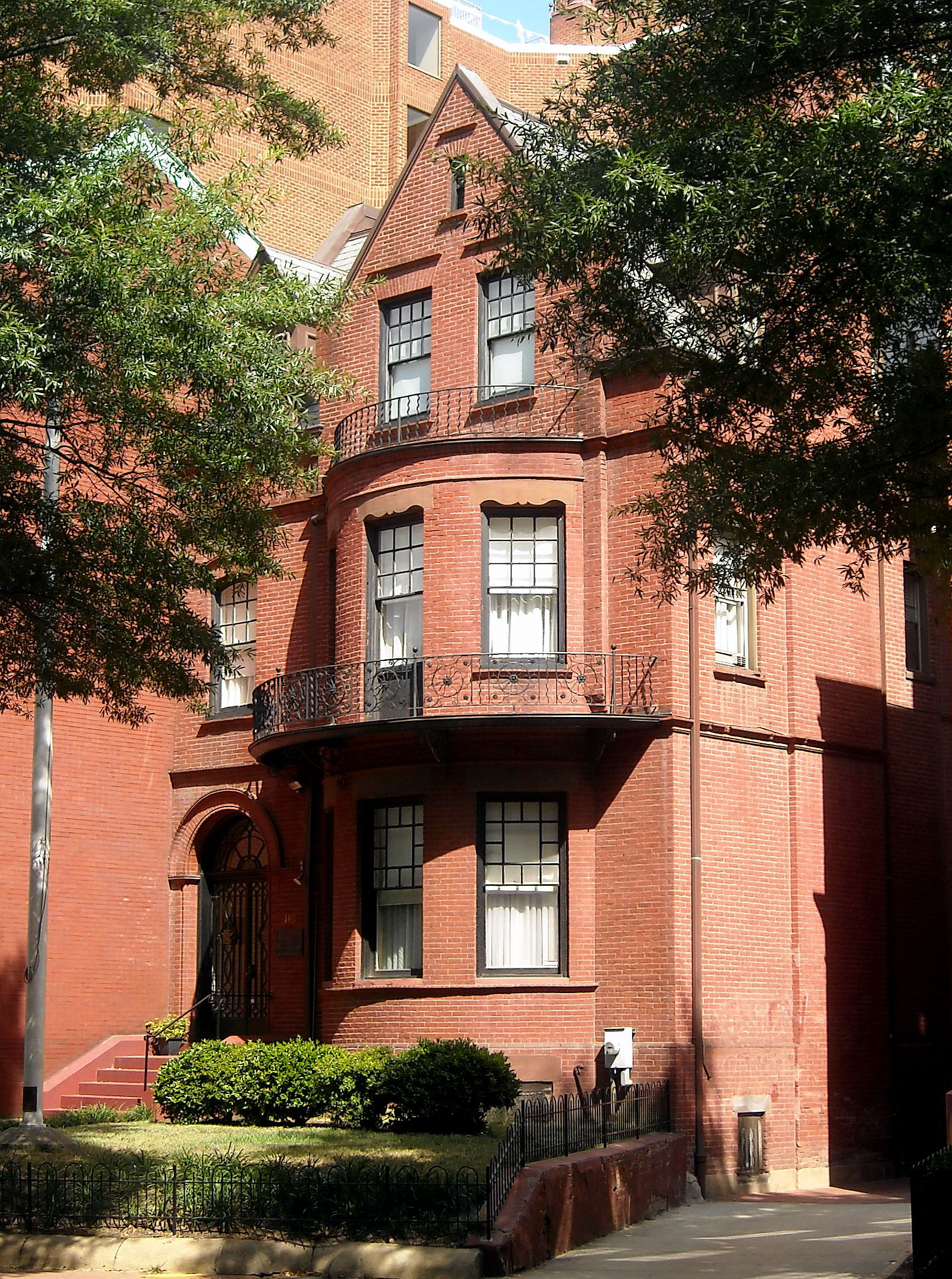

- Location within District of Columbia
- Location: 1461 Rhode Island Ave., NW, Washington, District of Columbia
- Coordinates: 38°54′30″N 77°2′2″W
- Area: less than one acre
- Built: 1884
- Built by: Langley & Gettinger
- Architect: Withers, Frederick
- Architectural style: Queen Anne
- NRHP reference No.: 97001469
- Added to NRHP: December 12, 1997

The United States Daughters of 1812, National Headquarters, also known as the Admiral John Henry Upshur House, is a Victorian Queen Anne building from 1884 which is listed on the National Register of Historic Places. The home was commissioned for Admiral John Henry Upshur. Since 1928, it has served as the national headquarters for the United States Daughters of 1812.

== History ==
The house was commissioned by near-retirement American admiral John Henry Upshur for architectural design by Frederick C. Withers and was constructed by builders Langley & Gettinger in 1884. It was later divided into three apartments.

The United States Daughters of 1812 bought the building in 1928 for $31,214.44 and have used it since as their national headquarters. Its NRHP nomination notes some irony in the historic organization's choice of a Victorian-style residence.

In April 1935, President National Jeanne Fox Weinmann placed a mast from the U.S.S. Constitution on the grounds.

The building houses the 1812 Memorial Library and the 1812 Museum.
