= Cecile Brawley Long =

American clubwoman (1900–1983)

President General of the United Daughters of the Confederacy
- In office 1951–1953
- Preceded by: Estelle Avinger Haggard
- Succeeded by: Mabel Sessions Dennis

Personal details
- Born: Cecile Maurice Brawley; August 16, 1900 Lockhart, South Carolina, U.S.
- Died: August 10, 1983 (aged 82) Newton, North Carolina, U.S.
- Resting place: Eastview Cemetery; Newton, North Carolina, U.S.
- Spouse: Victor Glenn Long (m. 1918)
- Children: 1
- Education: Davenport College
- Occupation: Educator; writer; clubwoman

Cecile Maurice Brawley Long (August 16, 1900 – August 10, 1983) was an American clubwoman, civic leader, and educator who served as President General of the United Daughters of the Confederacy.

== Early life and education ==
Long was born on August 16, 1900, in Lockhart, South Carolina, to John C. Brawley and Dorothea Daniel. She graduated from Davenport College in Lenoir, North Carolina.

== Career and social activities ==
Long worked as a teacher at Davenport College and served on the college's board of trustees. She was an active member of the Parents Teacher Association and helped establish lunchrooms in Newton-area schools.

In 1946, she helped organize the Newton Garden Club and served as president and as state parliamentarian and national parliamentarian. She authored a book on parliamentarian law for state and national garden clubs.

She was one of the organizers of the Bas Bea Club, where she was a sponsor and honorary president, and was a charter member of the American Legion Auxiliary in Newton. She was also an organizing president of the Catawba County Medical Society auxiliary.

Long was an amateur soprano and performed as a guest soloist throughout the United States. She co-organized a youth choir at First Methodist Church, where she served as superintendent of the youth choir and as director of the senior choir. Long also organized a glee club at a local high school.

=== United Daughters of the Confederacy ===
Long was a member of the United Daughters of the Confederacy and served as president of the Randsom-Sherrill UDC Chapter in 1932. Upon her election as the UDC State Division President, she was the youngest woman to serve as a state president in the organization's history. In 1948, she was instrumental in revising the UDC's constitution and bylaws.

On November 8, 1951, she was elected President General of the United Daughters of the Confederacy during the organization's 58th national convention in Asheville, North Carolina She was installed on November 9, 1951. She served in that office from 1951 to 1953. In 1952, ss president general, she attended a commemoration service at St. John's Episcopal Church in Brooklyn, New York celebrating the birthdays of General Robert E. Lee and Major General Stonewall Jackson.

== Personal life and death ==
She married Victor Glenn Long on June 20, 1918. They had a daughter, Dorothy. Long was a member of First Presbyterian Church, where she donated $125,000 for a building in honor of her daughter.

She died on August 10, 1983, at her home, 630 North Maine Avenue, in Newton. She was buried at Newton's Eastview Cemetery.
