= Ella Virginia Houck Holloway =

President National of the U.S. Daughters of 1812 (1862–1940)

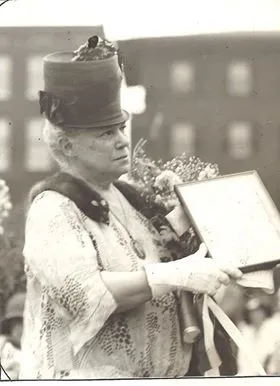

President National, U.S. Daughters of 1812
- In office 1916–1920

Personal details
- Born: Ella Virginia Houck; September 3, 1862 Baltimore, Maryland, U.S.
- Died: November 3, 1940 (aged 78) Baltimore, Maryland, U.S.
- Resting place: Druid Ridge Cemetery
- Spouse: Reuben Ross Holloway
- Children: 2
- Occupation: Socialite, clubwoman

Ella Virginia Houck Holloway (September 3, 1862 – November 3, 1940) was an American socialite and clubwoman. She served as President National of the United States Daughters of 1812 and led the organization's campaign to have "The Star Spangled Banner" established as the official national anthem of the United States.

== Early life ==
Holloway was born Ella Virginia Houck on September 3, 1862 in Baltimore, Maryland, to Jacob Wever Houck, a physician, and Susannah Frances Porter. The house she was born in was located next to the Phoenix Shot Tower. She was descended from an old Maryland family that dated back to the 1664 settlement of Todd's Inheritance. She was educated in private schools in Baltimore.

== Activism and civic work ==
Holloway was a proponent of American patriotic causes and was a member of the Children of the American Revolution, the Daughters of the American Revolution, the United States Daughters of 1812 and the United Daughters of the Confederacy. She was a strong opponent of communism and other similar political movements and advocated for a strong national defense, particularly in her support of the United States Navy. She also opposed women's suffrage and did not believe women should serve on juries.

Holloway was known for promoting education on proper protocol for the American flag and state flags and condemned the use of the American flag in women's apparel, cakes, and commercial items. She served as president of the Children of the American Revolution and was the Custodian of the Flags for the United Daughters of the Confederacy. She also served as Vice President of the Flag House Association, an organization that is responsible for the preservation of the home where Mary Pickersgill made the Star-Spangled Banner.

While marching in a Flag Day parade, she caused outrage among American Civil War veterans of the Grand Army of the Republic and Spanish–American War veterans for carrying the Confederate Stars and Bars. The veterans pledged not to participate the following year if Holloway continued to march with the Confederate flag.

When the Daughters of the American Revolution severed its connection with the Women's Patriotic Conference on National Defense in 1933, Holloway resigned from her three posts within the DAR as national vice chairwoman of the Eastern division and chairwoman on correct flag protocol for the Maryland State Society and the Francis Scott Key DAR chapter. She ultimately left the Daughters of the American Revolution because of it.

Holloway volunteered with the American Red Cross as one of the Gray Ladies, assisting patients and nurses at Marine hospitals.

=== U.S. Daughters of 1812 ===
Holloway served as the State President of the United States Daughters of 1812's Maryland society. From 1916 to 1920, she served as the organization's President National.

She was also the organization's Chair of the Committee on the Correct Use of the Flag and believed that American children should be taught to salute the American flag every morning before breakfast. Holloway also believed that all people should stand when the National Anthem was played. Holloway served as Chairwoman of the U.S. Daughters of 1812 Committee to foster a bill to name Francis Scott Key's "The Star Spangled Banner" as the official national anthem of the United States. In 1918, she petitioned Congressman J. Charles Linthicum to introduce the bill to the House of Representatives. Her campaign lasted for thirteen years, working tirelessly to gain support, before the bill became law. Linthicum referred to her as the "back of this movement".

== Personal life ==
Holloway was known for her trademark tall "shako" hat.

In 1892, she married Reuben Ross Holloway, a businessman who manufactured fire engines and extinguishers, at the Episcopal Church Of The Redeemer in Baltimore. They had two children.

Holloway died at the United States Marine Hospital in Baltimore on November 3, 1940. She was buried at Druid Ridge Cemetery and received a fourteen-gun salute from the United States Military at her funeral.
