= Kate Embry Dowdle Davis =

American socialite and historian

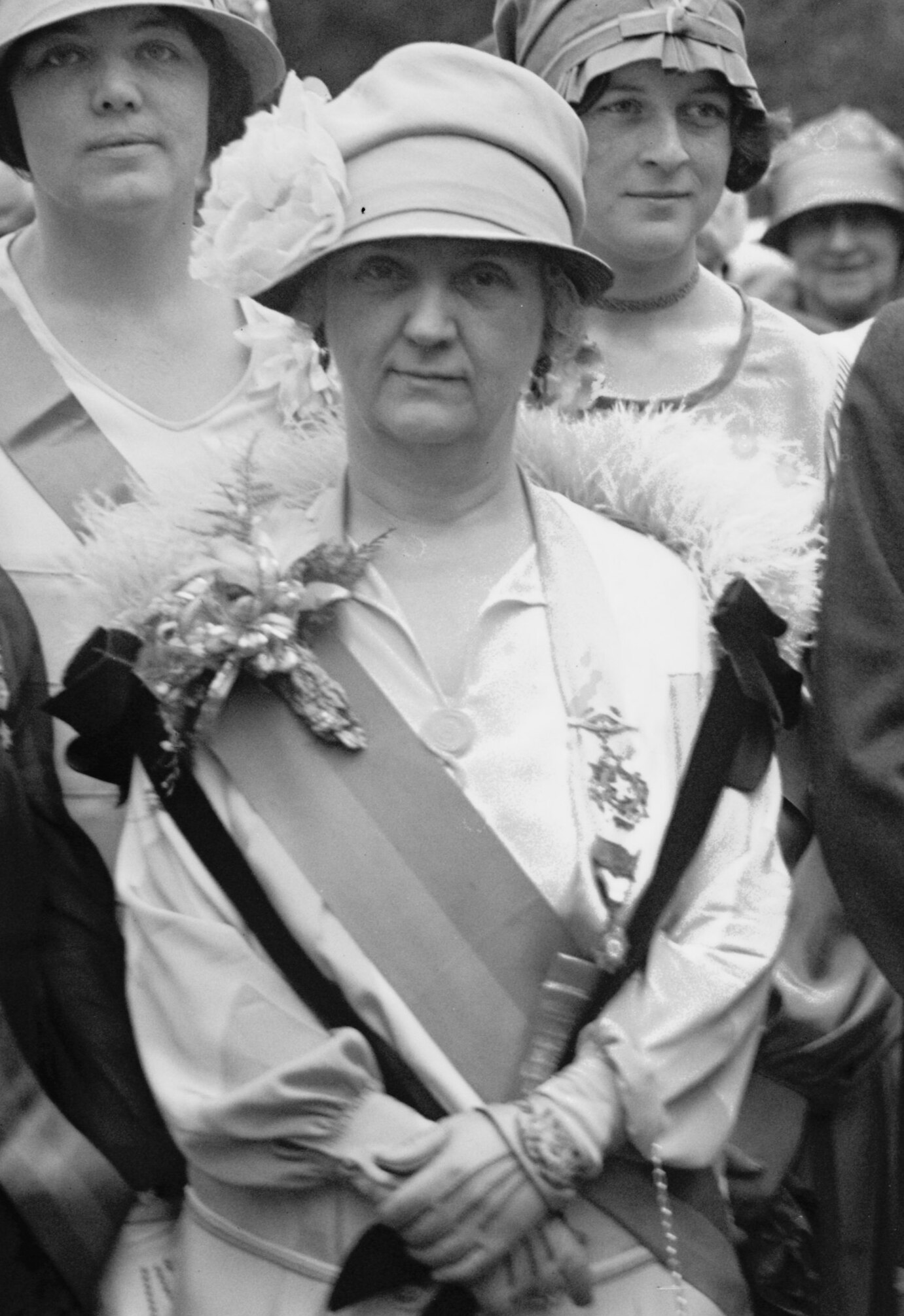
- Davis at the White House in 1927

President National, U.S. Daughters of 1812

Personal details
- Born: Kate Embry Dowdle; November 2, 1871 Little Rock, Arkansas, U.S.
- Died: September 27, 1954 (aged 82)
- Resting place: Oakland-Fraternal Cemetery
- Spouse: Samuel Preston Davis
- Children: 3

Kate Embry Dowdle Davis (November 2, 1871 – September 27, 1954), also known as Mrs. Samuel Preston Davis, was an American socialite, historian, and clubwoman who served as president national of the National Society of United States Daughters of 1812.

== Early life ==
Davis was born Kate Embry Dowdle on November 2, 1871, in Little Rock, Arkansas, to Robert Allen Dowdle and Rebecca Alyette Taylor Dowdle.

== Societies and clubs ==
Davis was active in patriotic and lineage societies, society events, and church work. She was a member of the Colonial Dames of America, the Daughters of the American Revolution, the United States Daughters of 1812, the United Daughters of the Confederacy, the Young Women's Christian Association, and The Aesthetic Club. She authored several woman's club and historical papers. One of her papers, on the poet and soldier Albert Pike, was published by the Masonic Albert Pike Consistory. She authored a history on the Arkansas State Society of the Daughters of the American Revolution, of which she served as state regent.

=== U.S. Daughters of 1812 ===
Davis served as regent of the Nicholas Headington Chapter of the U.S. Daughters of 1812, which presented a library to the battleship USS Arkansas. She later served as President National of the national society. In 1925, as president national, Davis collaborated with Rear Admiral Louis R. de Steiguer, A. C. Ratshesky, and W. D. Towner to lead the Save the Constitution Fund, which was created to finance repairs to the USS Constitution.

She and Honorary President National Ida Sherman Jenne visited President Calvin Coolidge at the White House in 1927.

== Personal life ==
Davis was a member of the Methodist Episcopal Church, South. She was a supporter of women's suffrage.

She was married to Samuel Preston Davis and had three children: Samuel Preston Jr., Allen Dowdle, and Rebecca Dowdle.
