= Lynn Forney Young =

43rd President General of the Daughters of the American Revolution

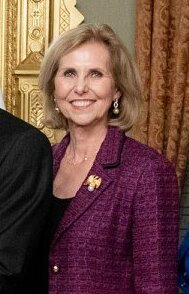
- Young in 2020

Commissioner for the United States Semiquincentennial
- Incumbent
- Assumed office 2017
- Appointed by: Paul Ryan

43rd President General of the National Society Daughters of the American Revolution
- In office 2013–2016
- Preceded by: Merry Ann T. Wright
- Succeeded by: Ann Turner Dillon

Personal details
- Party: Republican
- Spouse: Larry Steven Young
- Children: 2
- Education: Stephen F. Austin State University; University of Houston

Lynn Forney Young is an American civil leader and clubwoman. She was the 43rd President General of the Daughters of the American Revolution, serving from 2013 to 2016. As the organization's president general, she oversaw a $4 million restoration of DAR Constitution Hall, led the organization in setting a Guinness World Record for "most letters to military personnel collected in one month" with 100,904 letters to members of the United States Armed Forces, and met with Elizabeth II during an event to launch a project to digitize the Royal Archives of George III. In June 2016, Young was appointed to the United States Semiquincentennial Commission by House Speaker Paul Ryan and took office in 2017.

== Early life and education ==
Young was born and raised in Houston, Texas. She attended Stephen F. Austin State University, where she was a member of Delta Zeta. She graduated from the University of Houston.

== Career ==
Young is a member of a variety of historical and lineage societies, including the Daughters of the American Revolution, Milam County Historical Commission, El Camino Real de los Tejas National Historic Trail Association, the Jamestowne Society, the United Daughters of the Confederacy, the Colonial Dames of America, the National Society Descendants of American Farmers, the Daughters of the Republic of Texas, the National Society Daughters of the American Colonists, the National Society United States Daughters of 1812, and the National Society Colonial Dames XVII Century.

=== Daughters of the American Revolution ===
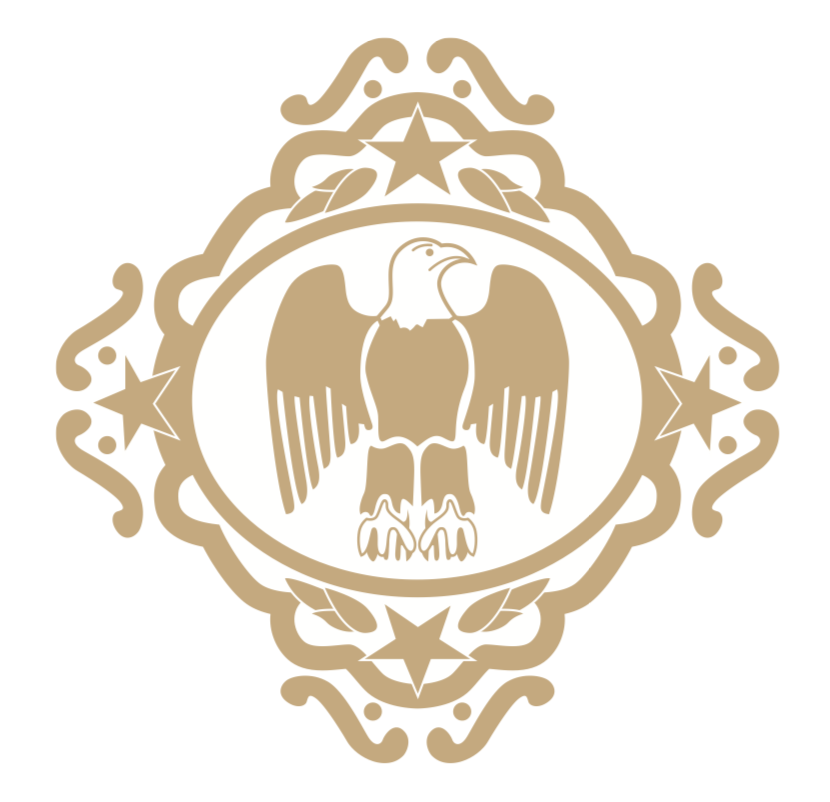
Majestic Eagle, symbol of the Young Administration

Young joined the Daughters of the American Revolution in the 1980s and has served many roles, from Regent of the Tejas Chapter to President General. Elected PG in 2013, she was the first DAR member from Texas to hold the office. The symbol of her administration was the "majestic eagle." Her administration's theme was “Honoring Our Heritage—Focusing on the Future—Celebrating America!,” commonly shortened to "Celebrate America!," and focused the DAR's role as a service organization. She encouraged Chapters and Members to celebrate the 125th anniversary of the NSDAR in 2015 and participate in the new Celebrate America! Committee, which focused on meaningful public service. She asked members to log one million service hours and ultimately 14 million hours were logged. Her term coincided with the 125th anniversary of the DAR in 2015.

As president general, she Celebrated the Daughters of the American Revolution's 125th Anniversary. The organization reached its highest yearly total of new members in 2013, with 13,906 new members. Young initiated the National DAR Day of Service and, under her term, members of the organization logged over 14.5 million service hours. The organization also set a Guinness World Record for "Most letters to military personnel collected in one month" by collecting 100,904 letters.

Young created the Sustaining Supporter Program, the Daughters Tribute, and the Guardian Trust Endowment Fund and oversaw facility upgrades at DAR Constitution Hall, including a cooling tower and chilled water pumping/distribution system, as well as the installation of a solar energy array. The renovations included over $4 Million in the historic preservation and restoration of Constitution Hall's 475-foot-long lobby, the President General's Reception Room, replacement of window sills in the Banquet Hall, exterior masonry work, carpet replacement, and gutter repair. She also oversaw technological advances including a new DAR website, installation of fiber optic cable to improve internet access and programming, new computers that doubled the capacity of the Seimes Technology Center, initiation of an electronic application, and upgrades in management software for the NSDAR Archives and Americana Collection.

On April 1, 2015, Young met with Queen Elizabeth II during an event to launch a project to digitize the Royal Archives of King George III.

=== U.S. Semiquincentennial Commission ===
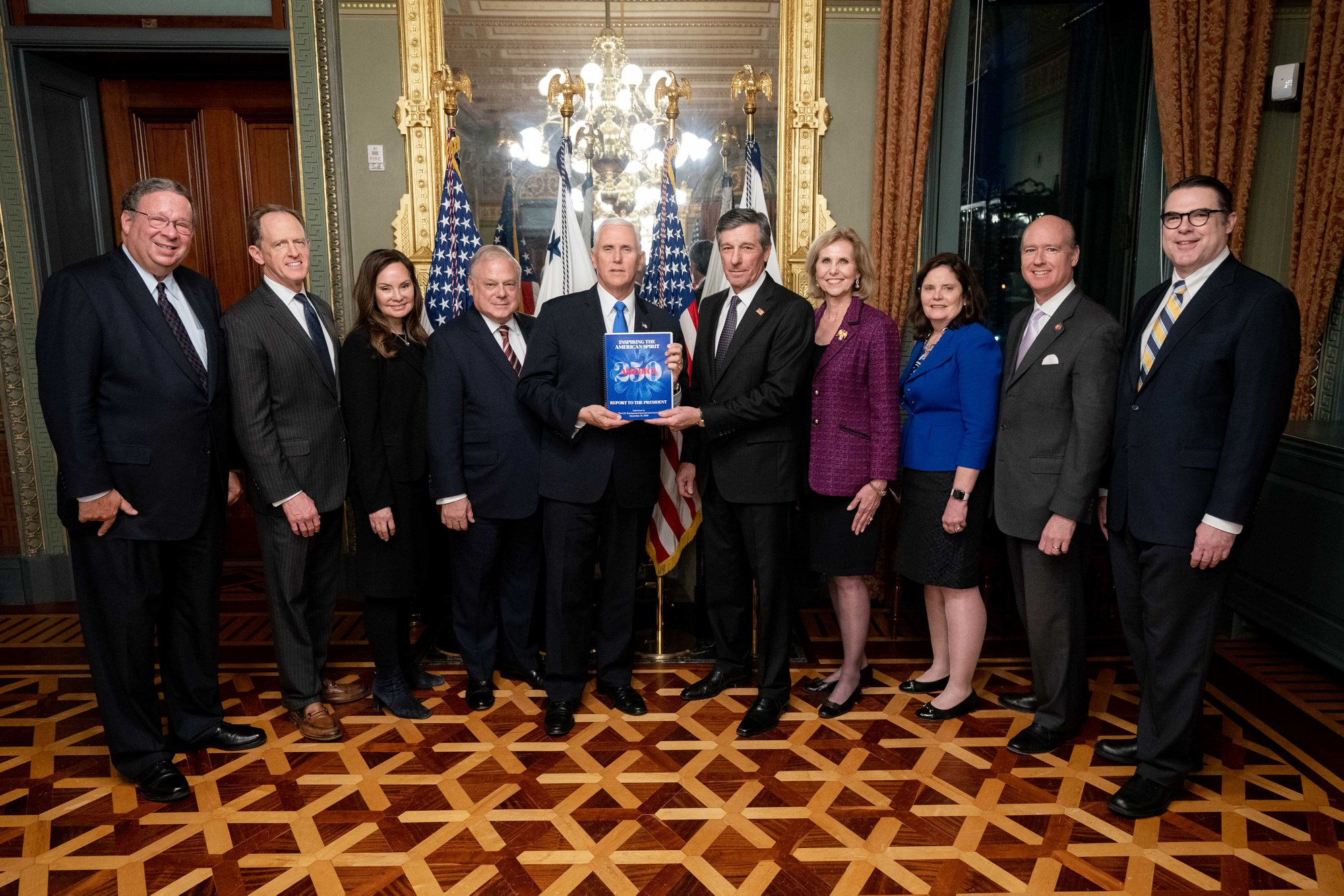
Members of the Semiquincentennial Commission present then-Vice President Mike Pence with a copy of a Congressionally-required report on January 15, 2020, at the Vice President's Ceremonial Office in the Eisenhower Executive Office Building. From left to right: David L. Cohen, Senator Pat Toomey, Rosa Gumataotao Rios, Frank Giordano, executive director of the commission, Vice President Mike Pence, Chairman Daniel DiLella, Lynn Forney Young, Cathy Gillespie, Congressman Robert Aderholt, and James L. Swanson.

Young was appointed to the United States Semiquincentennial Commission in June 2016 by Speaker of the House Paul Ryan, as one of 16 private citizens appointed. She will serve, in part, as a liaison between the more than 950,000 members of the Daughters of the American Revolution who are commemorating the U.S. Semiquincentennial through the DAR's pre-existing America 250! Committee. Young stated, “We look forward to celebrating our nation’s incredible history and fostering a renewed appreciation for all of the Americans who founded our nation and ensured its progress through the generations.”

== Personal life ==
Young lives on a cattle ranch in Milam County, near Austin, with her husband, Larry Steven Young. They have two children and three grandchildren.
