= Jeanne Fox Weinmann =

American clubwoman and historian

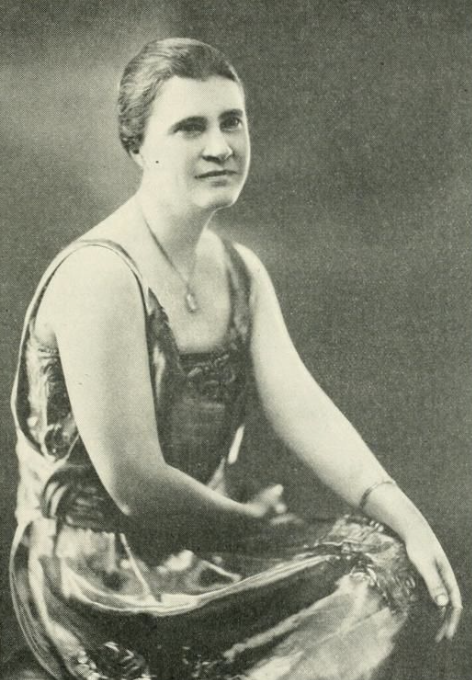

President of the Arkansas Historical Association
- In office 1953–1955

President General of the United Daughters of the Confederacy
- In office 1946–1948
- Succeeded by: Estelle Avinger Haggard

President National of the U.S. Daughters of 1812

Personal details
- Born: Jeanne Fox; September 19, 1874 Little Rock, Arkansas, U.S.
- Died: August 6, 1962 (aged 87) Little Rock, Arkansas, U.S.
- Resting place: Mount Holly Cemetery
- Spouse: John Francis Weinmann
- Children: 1
- Occupation: historian, socialite, clubwoman

Jeanne Fox Weinmann (September 19, 1874 – August 6, 1962) was an American clubwoman, socialite, and historian who served as President General of the United Daughters of the Confederacy and as President National of the U.S. Daughters of 1812. She was also a charter member of the National Society Daughters of the American Colonists, the first woman to serve on the board of trustees of the University of Arkansas, and the president of the Arkansas Historical Association.

== Early life and family ==
Weinmann was born Jeanne Fox on September 19, 1874, in Little Rock, Arkansas to John Wesley Fox and Ann Jeannette Compton. She descended from the pilgrim Thomas Fox of Concord, Massachusetts.

== Society and civic engagements ==
Weinmann was a prominent society figure and civic leader in Arkansas who was active in many women's clubs, lineage societies, and historical preservation efforts. She hosted many of local organizations, of which she was a member, in her home including the Arkansas Historical Association, the United Daughters of the Confederacy, the U.S. Daughters of 1812, the Junior Auxiliary, and the Junior League of Little Rock. She was a charter member of the National Society Daughters of the American Colonists. Weinmann was a member of the Daughters of the American Revolution and the Daughters of Founders and Patriots of America. She was also a member of the Descendants of Colonial Clergy, an organizer of the Arkansas Society of Colonial Wars, and a member of the Arkansas Pioneers Association. In 1921, she was awarded life membership in the Societe Academique d’Histoire Internationale, the only American woman at that time to be elected to the organization. She was also the Chevalier Commander of the Order of Lafayette in Arkansas.

Weinmann was a longtime member of the Arkansas Historical Association, serving as the association's president from 1953 to 1955. She helped establish the Arkansas Historical Quarterly in her role at the association. She was a member of the Arkansas History Commission from 1933 until her death. She was also a member of the Mary Washington Memorial Association. She was the first woman to serve on the board of trustees of the University of Arkansas, serving from 1935 to 1937.

=== U.S. Daughters of 1812 ===
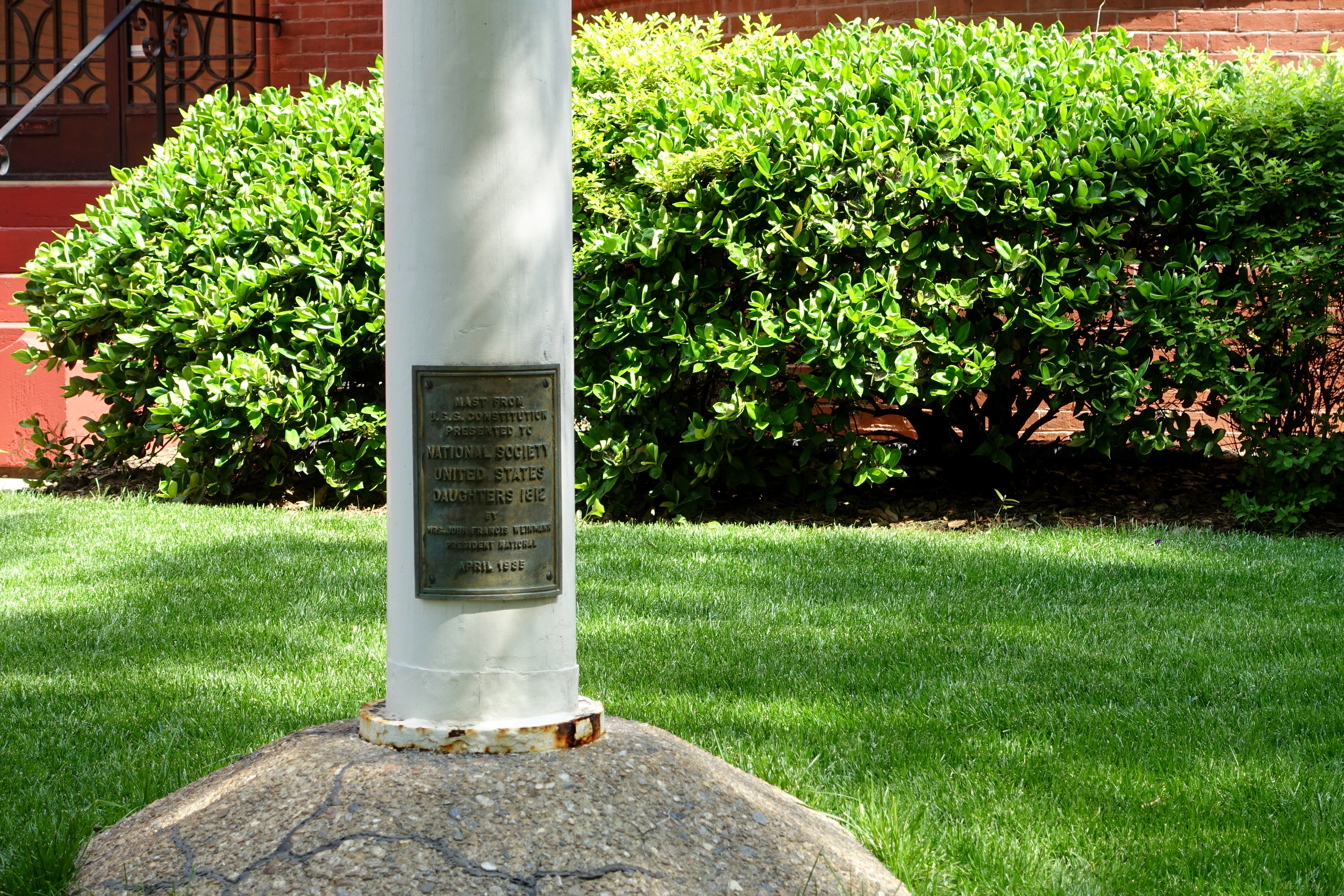
Mast of the U.S.S. Constitution.

Weinmann organized the General George Izard Chapter of the U.S. Daughters of 1812. She served as the eighth president national of the United States Daughters of 1812 for many years. On April 26, 1936, she presented an 1812 banner at the Washington National Cathedral. In April 1935, she presented the national society with a mast from the U.S.S. Constitution to be displayed at the United States Daughters of 1812, National Headquarters in Washington, D.C.

She presented a paper to the national society's 1953 session titled The War of 1812 Moved Into Arkansas, emphasizing the role the War of 1812 had in the lives of early prominent figures in Arkansas history.

=== United Daughters of the Confederacy ===
Weinmann was regent of the T.J. Churchill Chapter of the United Daughters of the Confederacy. She served as president general of the United Daughters of the Confederacy from 1946 to 1948.

== Personal life ==
She married John Francis Weinmann, a prominent business leader in Little Rock, Arkansas and owner of the J. F. Weinmann Milling Company, in 1902. Together, they raised her son, Cecil, from a previous marriage. They lived in a large Tudor Revival house in the Central High School Neighborhood Historic District of Little Rock.

Weinmann died in hospital on August 6, 1962. She was buried next to her husband in Mount Holly Cemetery.
