= Order of Lafayette =

The Order of Lafayette is a fraternal organization of American military officers who served in France or French territory during World War I or World War II, as well as their descendants.

It was established in New York City in 1958 by Colonel Hamilton Fish III (1888-1991), a former Congressman from New York and decorated veteran of the First World War. The Order's patron is the Marquis de Lafayette, the French officer who was commissioned a general in the Continental Army, and who served with George Washington during the American Revolution. The Order's principles are "God, Unity, Peace, Honor".

A serving officer of the famed 369th Regiment (The Harlem Hellfighters), New York Army National Guard, Colonel Fish founded the Order of Lafayette as a society to give recognition to all commissioned officers of the United States Armed Forces, male or female, who served in France during World War I, or in France or French possessions during World War II. It also includes United States officers who served in France during World War I in the Lafayette Escadrille Flying Corps, the American Field Service, or with the Allies of World War I. Military service in France includes participating in an invasion or flight within the coastal areas of France or French possessions.

== Eligibility for membership ==
American commissioned officers (and enlisted men who were later commissioned) who served in France or in French possessions during World War I or World War II, are eligible for membership in the Order of Lafayette, as well as commissioned officers and non-commissioned officers of the French Foreign Legion. Membership in the order is also open to all recipients, regardless of rank, of the Medal of Honor or the French Médaille militaire who served in France or French possessions during World War I or World War II, and are admitted as members without having to pay dues to the Order. All lineal descendants, male or female, of original members, or those who would have qualified as original members, are eligible for full membership in the Order on reaching the age of 21.

== Activities ==
The Order participates in a number of patriotic activities, such as the annual Armistice Day Memorial Mass at Saint Vincent de Paul's R.C. Church held each November in New York City; the graduation convocation of the United States Military Academy at West Point, New York, where the Order of Lafayette Award is given to a distinguished graduate; social and cultural gatherings to promote and improve Franco-American relations; the annual "Massing of the Colors" ceremony each autumn, and other events.

== Insignia ==
Insignia of the Order of Lafayette.

Membership in the Order of Lafayette entitles one to wear the order's medal and rosette. The medal, made by Arthus Bertrand of Paris, is a white cross pattée with a profile of Lafayette in its center, surrounded by laurel leaves. The rosette is worn on the lapel.

== Flag ==
The flag of the Order of Lafayette was designed by Kenneth A. Menken. Based on the French Tricolor, it incorporates 13 stars and the Order of Lafayette's insignia in the center. The flag symbolizes France's contributions to the struggle for American independence during the American Revolution, and at the same time, America's defense of freedom on French soil during two conflicts, the First and Second World Wars.

== Notable members ==
- Jeanne Fox Weinmann (1874–1962), lineage society leader
