= Julie Noegel Hardaway =

American clubwoman

President General of the United Daughters of the Confederacy
- Incumbent
- Assumed office 2024
- Preceded by: Jinny Widowski

Personal details
- Spouse: J. Clifford Hardaway

Julie Noegel Hardaway is an American clubwoman who has served as President General of the United Daughters of the Confederacy since 2024.

== Early life and family ==
Hardaway grew up in Augusta, Georgia. She is the daughter of Frederick William Noegel, Jr. and Nellie Swann Noegel. Her ancestors settled in America during the Colonial period.

== Lineage societies ==
Hardaway is a member of the United Daughters of the Confederacy, the Southern Dames of America, the Jamestowne Society, and the Daughters of the American Revolution (DAR). In 2010, she served as the regent of the Peter Force Chapter DAR. She also served as the regent of the Henry Middleton Chapter DAR.

=== United Daughters of the Confederacy ===
Hardaway served as Chaplain General of the United Daughters of the Confederacy. In 2024, she succeeded Jinny Widowski as the president general of the United Daughters of the Confederacy. Her term will end in 2026.

In January 2025, she spoke out against Virginia House Bill 1699, a bipartisan effort in the Virginia House of Delegates to remove tax-exempt status from organizations tied to the Confederate States of America. She stated that the United Daughters of the Confederacy strongly opposed the bill, going on to claim that Confederate organizations were being targeted by the "party in power" which deemed them "unworthy".

In February 2026, Hardaway said that the proposed Virginia House Bill 167, which would end tax exemptions for Confederacy-based organizations in Virginia, "reeks of discrimination, based on misguided and biased opinions of our great philanthropic organization." Governor Abigail Spanberger signed a bill into law in April 2026.

== Personal life ==
Hardaway lives in Aiken, South Carolina. She is a Southern Baptist and attends Town Creek Baptist Church. She is married to J. Clifford Hardaway.
