= Estelle Avinger Haggard =

American schoolteacher and clubwoman

President of the United Daughters of the Confederacy
- In office 1949–1951
- Preceded by: Jeanne Fox Weinmann
- Succeeded by: Cecile Brawley Long

Personal details
- Born: Lula Estelle Avinger; July 20, 1884 Alabama, U.S.
- Died: October 27, 1977 (aged 93) Miami, Florida, U.S.
- Resting place: Caballero Rivero Woodlawn Park North Cemetery and Mausoleum
- Spouse: William Andrew Haggard
- Children: 2
- Parents: John Wesley Avinger (father); Mary Amanda Kirkpatrick (mother)
- Occupation: schoolteacher

Lula Estelle Avinger Haggard (July 20, 1884 – October 27, 1977) was an American schoolteacher and clubwoman who served as President General of the United Daughters of the Confederacy from 1949 to 1951.

== Early life and family ==
Haggard was born Lula Estelle Avinger on July 20, 1884. She was the daughter of Confederate States Army veteran John Wesley Avinger.

== Career ==
Haggard was a teacher in Alabama for several years prior to her marriage.

Following the death of her husband, she dedicated her time to the United Daughters of the Confederacy. She was elected as President General of the United Daughters of the Confederacy during the organization's national convention in New Orleans in 1949.

In 1950, Haggard gave a talk during a meeting of descendants of Robert E. Lee and Ulysses S. Grant.

In 1951, she went on an official visit to Georgia, where she was a guest of Mr. and Mrs. Belmont Dennis in Covington and attended a luncheon with the United Daughters of the Confederacy chapter in Athens. Later that week she attended a luncheon hosted by the four Atlanta UDC chapters at Hart House and a dinner party at East Lake Country Club. From there, she travelled to Dublin and Waycross to meet with local UDC chapters before returning to her home in Florida.

== Personal life ==
She married William Andrew Haggard, a doctor from Miami, Florida. They had two children.
