= Jamestowne Society =

Lineage society

- Seal of the Jamestowne Society
- Formation: May 14, 1936
- Type: Historical-Patriotic-Hereditary Society
- Legal status: 501(c)(3) organization
- Purpose: Educational, historical, academic, and patriotic
- Headquarters: 3901 Midlands Road, Williamsburg, VA 23188
- Region served: Nationwide
- Website: http://www.jamestowne.org/

Jamestowne Society is an organization founded in 1936 by George Craghead Gregory for descendants of stockholders in the Virginia Company of London and the descendants of those who owned land or who had domiciles in Jamestown or on Jamestown Island prior to the year 1700.

== Jamestown ==
In May 1607, Jamestown was established as the first permanent English settlement in what is now the United States. It was founded by the London branch of the Virginia Company, which was competing with the Plymouth branch to settle the Colony of Virginia.

Jamestown was the capital of the Colony for 92 years, from 1607 until 1699. At that time, the capital was relocated to Middle Plantation, about 8 miles (13 km) distant. (That small community, which had also become home to the new College of William and Mary in 1693, was renamed Williamsburg in 1699).

== George Craghead Gregory ==
George Craghead Gregory (1878–1956) was an attorney and businessman based in Richmond who had a strong interest in Virginia's history and was also an author and historian. In 1932, he was working at property owned by Preservation Virginia (formerly known as the Association for the Preservation of Virginia Antiquities) on Jamestown Island and discovered the foundation of the first brick statehouse (capitol) building circa 1646.

== The Society ==
The society was formed to bring together as many of the descendants of stockholders in the Virginia Company of London and the descendants of those who owned land or who had domiciles in Jamestown or on Jamestown Island prior to the year 1700 as possible.

Since its founding, the Society has helped conserve colonial records, financially supported the archaeology dig inside the Memorial Church at Jamestown, paid for the casting of the replica bell, and partnered with Jamestown Rediscovery to publish Church & State: The Archaeology of the Foundations of Democracy in 2019. The Society also funded the rebuilding of the Barracks Exhibit in 2020, and funded the Eastern Expansion Dig in 2021. The Society has branches, called "Companies." (In the Jamestowne Society, "Companies" are similar to chapters in most lineage societies). Membership in Companies is elective, while membership in the national Society is acquired at the time a member proves descent to a Jamestown Settler or Stockholder.

In 1983, the Society was formally organized as a non-profit corporation under section 501(c)(3) of the Internal Revenue Code (1954, as amended). The Society holds annual meetings and events. The Jamestowne Society moved its headquarters to Williamsburg, Virginia on February 7, 2022; the headquarters was previously located in Richmond, Virginia. Jamestowne Society is listed as an approved lineage society with the Hereditary Society Community of the United States of America.

== Notable members ==
- John Fleming, politician
- Judith Godwin, painter
- George C. Gregory, attorney and historian
- Julie Noegel Hardaway, lineage society leader
- Dale Mercer, socialite and television personality
- Wilhelmena Rhodes Kelly, genealogist
- Mary Martha Presley Merritt, politician
- Cher Sesma, lineage society leader
- Harrison Ruffin Tyler, chemical engineer and preservationist
- Presley Merritt Wagoner, lineage society leader
- Marie Hirst Yochim, lineage society leader
- Lynn Forney Young, lineage society leader
