= Continental Society Daughters of Indian Wars =

Lineage society

- Abbreviation: CSDIW
- Established: October 26, 1988; 38 years ago
- Founders: Virginia Turner Avery
- Founded at: Atlanta, Georgia, U.S.
- Type: lineage society, charity
- Headquarters: Oklahoma City, Oklahoma, U.S.
- Governor General: Deborah Whitmore Hicks
- Website: csdiw.com

Continental Society Daughters of Indian Wars (often abbreviated as CSDIW) is a lineage society for women who are direct descendants of participants of the American Indian Wars.

== History ==
The Continental Society Daughters of Indian Wars was organized by Virginia Turner Avery on October 26, 1988, in Atlanta, Georgia, to honor women descended from Colonial American leaders and soldiers who performed military and civil service during the American Indian Wars, including King Philip's War, the French and Indian Wars, Pontiac's War, the Northwest Indian War, and the Seminole Wars. The organization established its first state societies in Georgia, Indiana, Missouri, and Oklahoma. The organization had fourteen state organizations established by 1995.

The organization's national headquarters is located in Oklahoma City, Oklahoma.

During the administration of CSDIW Governor General Deborah Whitmore Hicks, which began in 2026, the society announced it would advocate for justice and support legal aid and educational resources for Native Americans living on reservations. The CSDIW also accepted donations for dependable water resources on reservations.

== Membership ==
The Continental Society Daughters of Indian Wars is a lineage society for women, of at least eighteen years of age, who are direct descendants of Indigenous Americans or European Colonists who participated in the American Indian Wars or who participated in any capacity in actual hostilities during the period between May 14, 1607, to 1900.

== Objectives ==
The society preserves records and historic sites associated with indigenous and immigrant Americans who participated or contributed to the conflicts between each other. It also promotes patriotism and support for all treaties and laws made between the United States government and indigenous tribes, bands, and nations.

The organization awards Native American Scholarships to enrolled indigenous tribal members who plan to work with a Native American tribe or nation in education or social services. The Arkansas Society of the Daughters of Indian Wars contributes financially to Bacone College and the Sequoyah National Research Center at the University of Arkansas at Little Rock.

The organization also recognizes individuals who self-identifying as being of Native American descent so long as the documented ancestry is provided, regardless if the individual has recognition from an indigenous tribe or nation.

== Notable members ==
- Cher Sesma, CSDIW Governor General and President National of the U.S. Daughters of 1812

== See also ==
- Order of the Indian Wars of the United States
- National Society Daughters of Colonial Wars
