= Navy Department Library =

Coordinates: 38.875°N 76.994°W

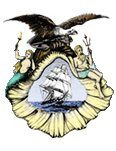
The library's logo, originally a 1906 bookplate

The Navy Department Library is the official library of the United States Department of the Navy. Located at the Washington Navy Yard in Washington, D.C., it is a part of the Naval History and Heritage Command.

== History ==
Secretary of the Navy Benjamin Stoddert received a letter from President John Adams dated On March 31, 1800 directing him to establish a library for the United States Department of the Navy. It was asked that the literature acquired and stored included works detailing the theory and practice of naval architecture, navigation, and naval combat. Additionally, the parameters for the written works origin was not to be limited to English but inclusive of any nation's success.

Despite the letter dating back to 1800, the library's origin can be dated back to the War Department in Philadelphia in 1794. Subsequently, the Navy received departmental status in 1798 and the collection of materials relating to naval affairs were transferred out of the Philadelphia library and into that of a tavern in Trenton, New Jersey. It was once the national capital moved to Washington that the Department of the Navy officially found refuge in Georgetown.

The Navy's library survived the 1814 burning of Washington during the War of 1812 and, after the end of the war, located to the Old Navy Department Building. The library had some 1300 volumes in its collection by 1824, although many items were subsequently transferred to the Library of Congress.

The Library is part of the Federal Depository Library Program.

== Collections and subjects ==
As of 2019, the Library contains an estimated 114,000 book titles; 374,000 manuscripts; and 189,000 periodical issues. Some 5,644 items in the collection are considered rare. The collection emphasizes "naval, nautical, and military history" including the history of the United States Navy and foreign navies. The public may borrow from most of the library's collection via interlibrary loan.

The library uses the Library of Congress Classification system and employs Online Computer Library Center services (with an interface via WorldCat) for cataloging and interlibrary loans.

The library's rare book room, a climate-controlled vault being renovated in 2013–2014, contains books written before 1600, and many more recent items such as John Paul Jones' calling card collection from when he was with the Russian navy, and documents captured on German submarine U-505 when Daniel V. Gallery boarded it in 1944. Another item is Captain John Smith’s treatise on the duties of sailing men, called An Accidence or Path-way to Experience (1626), a precursor to The Bluejacket's Manual. Additional highlights of the collection include Thomas Truxtun's Instructions, Signals and Explanations... (1797), the U.S. Navy's first signal book; rare Civil War materials from the Union Navy and Confederate Navy; and Germany Navy war diaries.

The library's logo, derived from a 1906 bookplate designed in the U.S. Naval Hydrographic Office, features a bald eagle, an anchor, Neptune and Nereid, a seashell, and the USS Constitution, all nautical and national symbols.
