= National Society of United States Daughters of 1812 =

American patriotic organization

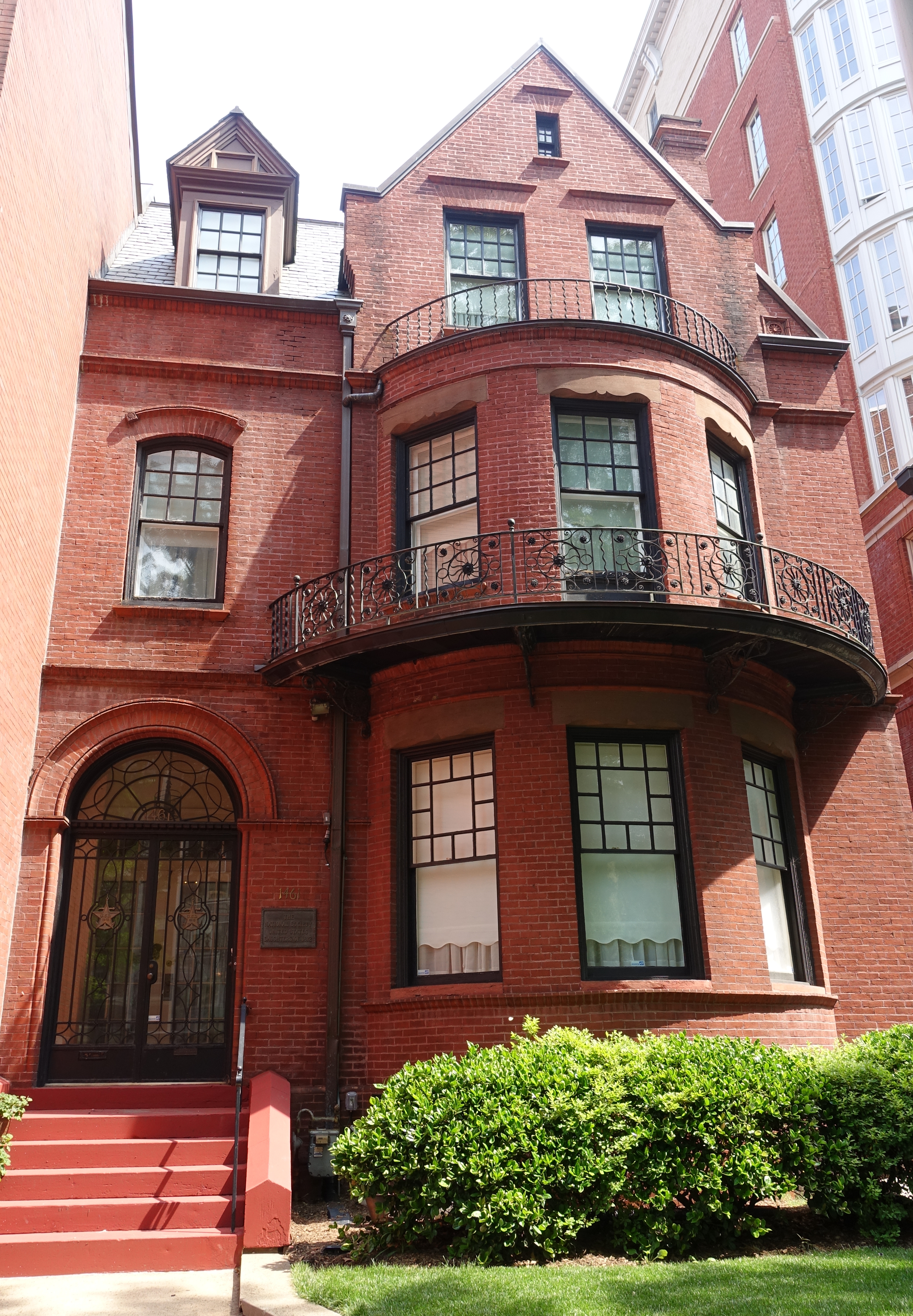
- The U.S. Daughters of 1812 National Headquarters in Washington, D.C.
- Abbreviation: USD 1812; NSUSD 1812
- Named after: The War of 1812
- Established: January 8, 1892 (134 years ago)
- Founder: Flora Adams Darling
- Founded at: Cleveland, Ohio, U.S.
- Type: 501(c)(3), patriotic society
- Tax ID no.: 53-0116360
- Headquarters: Admiral John Henry Upshur House; 1461 Rhode Island Avenue, N.W., Washington, D.C.
- Coordinates: 38.90835°N 77.03418°W
- Region served: United States
- Members: 6,000
- President National: Cher Sesma
- Affiliations: General Society of the War of 1812
- Website: usdaughters1812.org

The National Society of United States Daughters of 1812 (USD 1812), commonly known as the U.S. Daughters of 1812, is a lineage-based patriotic society headquartered in Washington, D.C. It was established by Flora Adams Darling in 1892 in Cleveland, Ohio and incorporated in 1901 by the United States Congress. Membership is limited to women who are lineal descendants of people who performed military or civil service for the United States between 1784 and 1815.

== History ==
The National Society was established on January 8, 1892 in Cleveland, Ohio by the author Flora Adams Darling, a member of the Adams political family, for the purpose of perpetuating the memory of the founders of the United States, with their records of service in the French and Indian War, the American Revolution, and War of 1812.

In 1908, the National Society donated £250 to help fund the addition of stained glass by Franz Mayer of Munich at the Church of St Michael and All Angels in Princetown, England. The church was built by prisoners from the Napoleonic Wars and finished by those captured during the War of 1812 who were held in the nearby Dartmoor Prison. The National Society's contribution of the stained glass commemorated the lives of those who died in the War of 1812 and the Americans who were imprisoned at Dartmoor. The stained glass windows were installed in 1910 and the National Society placed a memorial plaque at the American Prisoner of War Cemetery in 1928.

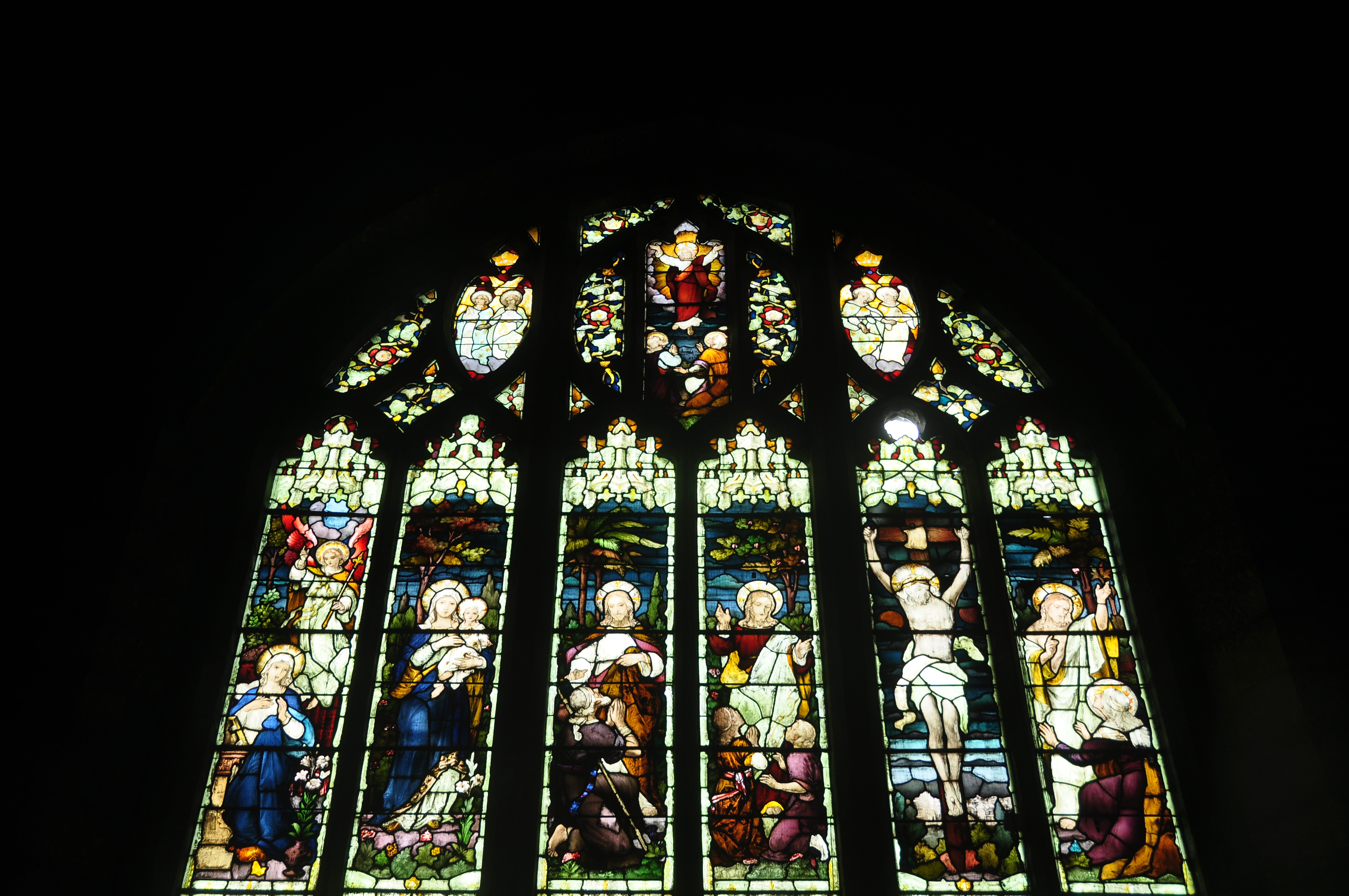
Stained glass at St Michael and All Angels Church, donated by the U.S. Daughters of 1812

In 1918, the Maryland Society of the U.S. Daughters of 1812, led by Ella Virginia Houck Holloway of Baltimore, launched a campaign to establish Francis Scott Key's "The Star-Spangled Banner" as the official national anthem of the United States. This led Congressman John Linthicum of Maryland to introduce a bill in Congress to establish the national anthem, but it failed to gain support. On January 30, 1930, representatives from sixty patriotic organizations rallied for support of the national anthem in Washington, D.C. The bill passed in the House of Representatives on April 21, 1930 and in the Senate on March 3, 1931. President Herbert Hoover signed the bill into law later that day.

In 1921, President National Ida Sherman Jenne, on behalf of the national society, donated an archived list of American prisoners of war from the War of 1812 to the Navy Department Library at the Washington Navy Yard. The national society also presented a library to the battleship USS Arkansas (BB-33).

In 1925, under the leadership of Kate Embry Dowdle Davis, the national society led various patriotic societies in financing and fundraising for the restoration of the USS Constitution.

In 1927, Jenne and Davis, along with young members serving as pages, where received at the White House by President Calvin Coolidge.

On April 26, 1936, the national society presented an 1812 banner to the Washington National Cathedral.

== Organization ==
The National Society of United States Daughters of 1812 admits women who are lineal descendants from an ancestor who assisted in the War of 1812, either as an officer, soldier, sailor, or in any way gave aid to the war effort.

The official insignia of the national society is a single star resting upon an anchor and encircled with a narrow band, representing the star of hope upon the anchor of fate within the circle of friendship.

The national society functions as a non-profit, non-political, women’s service organization focused on promoting patriotism, increasing knowledge of American history by the preservation of documents and relics, marking historic spots, and educating the public about the roles and deeds of those in civil, military, and naval life who contributed to the development and growth of the United States between the close of the American Revolution and the close of the War of 1812. They place historical markers throughout the country.

Their Associate Council national conference is held annually in Washington, D.C.

== Headquarters ==
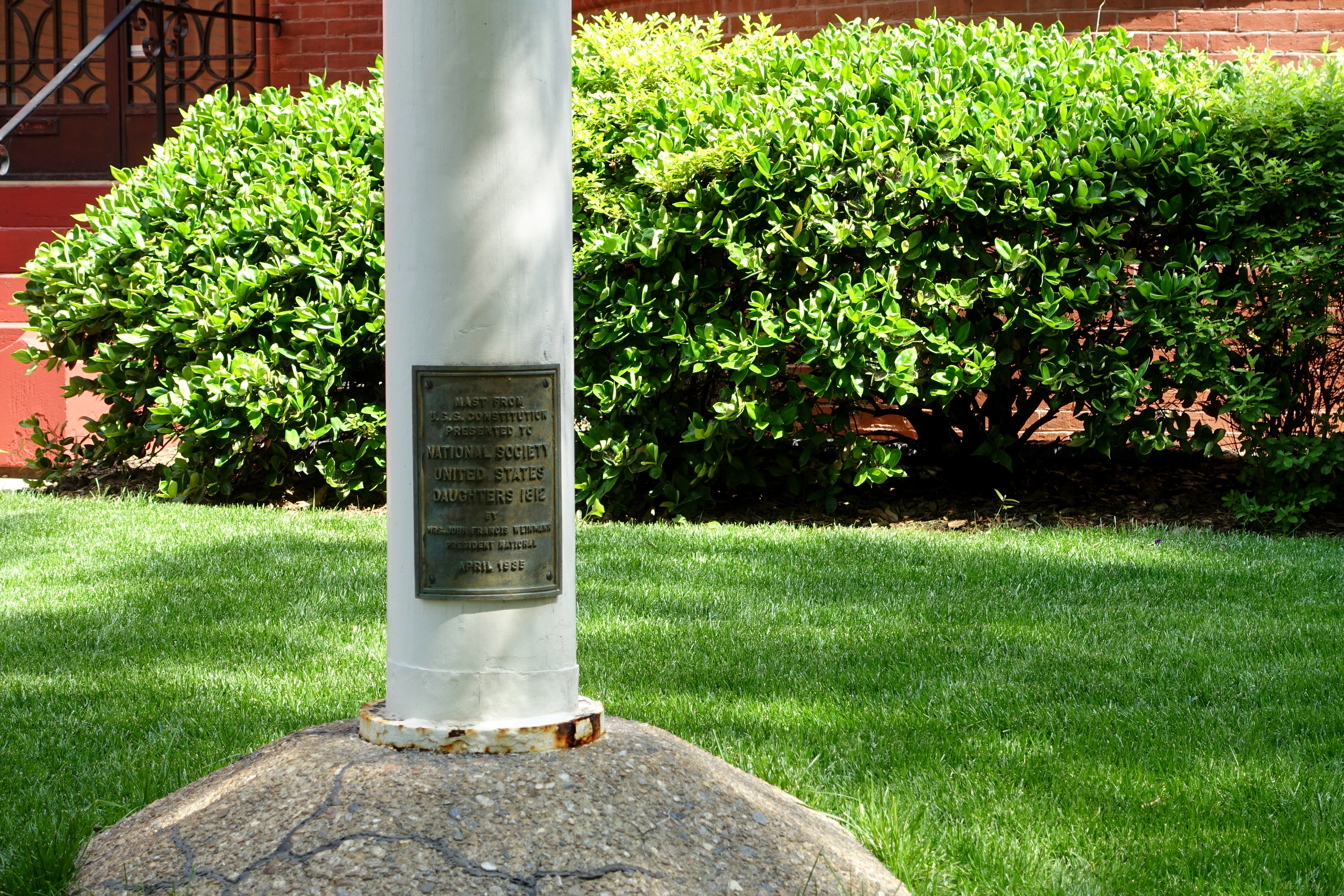
Mast of the U.S.S. Constitution at USD1812 Headquarters.

The National Society is headquartered at the Admiral John Henry Upshur House, located at 1461 Rhode Island Avenue, N.W. in Washington, D.C. They purchased the property in 1928. It was added to the National Register of Historic Places in 1997. The national headquarters houses the 1812 Memorial Library and the 1812 Museum.

In April 1935, President National Jeanne Fox Weinmann presented the national society with a mast from the U.S.S. Constitution to be displayed at the National Headquarters.

== Notable members ==
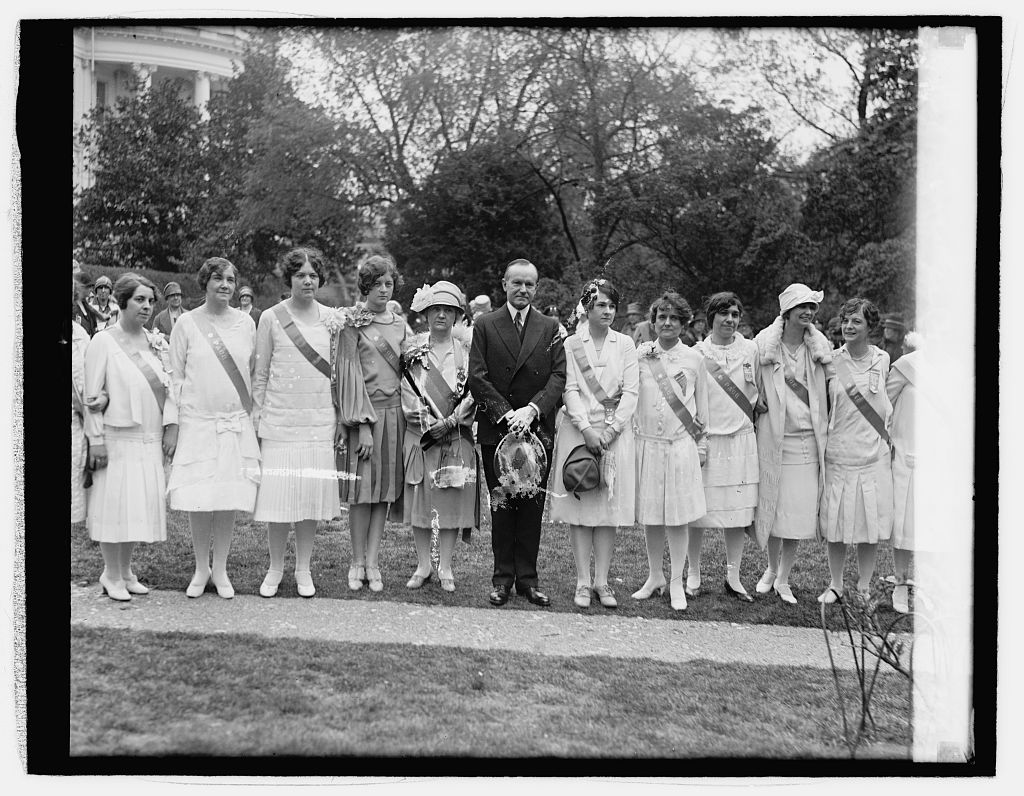
President National Kate Embry Dowdle Davis and pages of the U.S. Daughters of 1812 with President Calvin Coolidge at the White House in 1927

- Dianne Cannestra, quilter and National President of the United States Daughters of 1812
- Ruth Coltrane Cannon, preservationist, historian, and philanthropist
- Flora Adams Darling, Founder of U.S. Daughters of 1812
- Kate Embry Dowdle Davis, President National of the U.S. Daughters of 1812
- Ann Turner Dillon, 44th President General of the Daughters of the American Revolution
- Clara L. Brown Dyer, Founder of the Maine Society, United States Daughters of 1812
- Ann Davison Duffie Fleck, 34th President General of the Daughters of the American Revolution
- Maud Callaway Hays, President National of the U.S. Daughters of 1812
- Ella Virginia Houck Holloway, President National of the U.S. Daughters of 1812
- Frances Adelaide Leverich Ingraham (died 1934), President General of the Daughters of the Revolution 1776 and Directoress General of the Daughters of Holland Dames
- Ida Sherman Jenne (1860–1934), President National of the U.S. Daughters of 1812
- Birdie Robertson Johnson (1868–1926), suffragist and president of the Texas Federation of Women's Clubs
- Sarah McKelley King, 33rd President General of the Daughters of the American Revolution
- Katie Cabell Currie Muse, 4th President General of the United Daughters of the Confederacy
- Maria Purdy Peck, essayist and social economist
- E. Jean Nelson Penfield, co-founder, League of Women Voters; National President, Kappa Kappa Gamma
- Leonora St. George Rogers Schuyler (1868–1952), socialite, President General of the United Daughters of the Confederacy
- Cher Sesma, President National of the U.S. Daughters of 1812, Governor General of the Continental Society Daughters of Indian Wars
- Emma H. Slade, President National of the U.S. Daughters of 1812, Founder of the National Society of New England Women
- Almyra Maynard Watson, officer in the United States Army Nurse Corps
- Jeanne Fox Weinmann, 8th President National of U.S. Daughters of 1812, President General of the United Daughters of the Confederacy
- Pamela Rouse Wright, 46th President General of the Daughters of the American Revolution
- Lynn Forney Young, 43rd President General of the Daughters of the American Revolution

== See also ==
- The Eighth
