= Kathryn Slaughter Wittichen =

American clubwoman

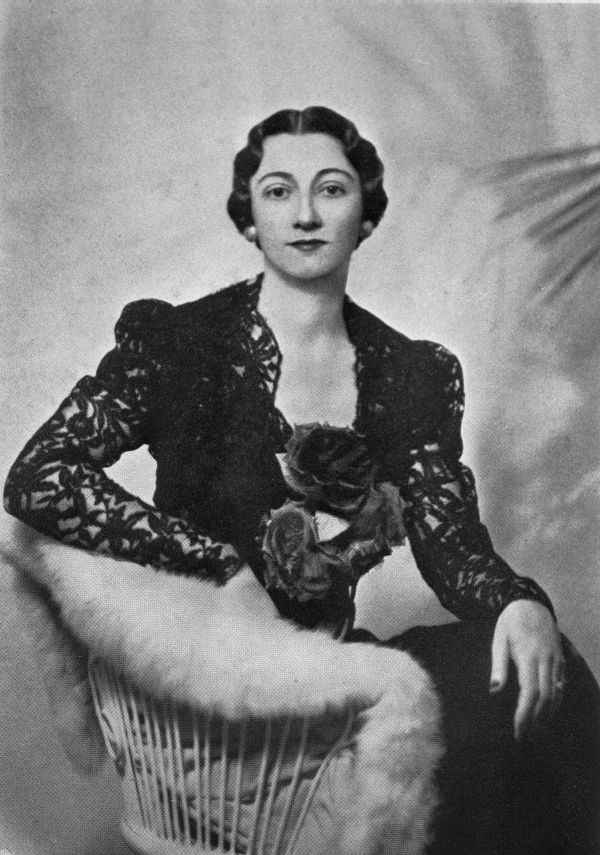

Honorary President of the Southern Dames of America
- In office 1962–1963
- Preceded by: Office established
- Succeeded by: Doris Walker Lyle (as president)

President General of the United Daughters of the Confederacy
- In office 1957–1960
- Succeeded by: Elizabeth Cody Bachman

President of the Miami Women's Club
- In office 1938–1939

Personal details
- Born: Kathryn Elizabeth Slaughter; January 8, 1896 Jackson, Mississippi, U.S.
- Died: June 22, 1985 (aged 89) Miami, Florida, U.S.
- Resting place: Greenwood Cemetery
- Spouse: Murray Forbes Wittichen
- Occupation: clubwoman, socialite

Kathryn Elizabeth Slaughter Wittichen (January 8, 1896 – June 22, 1985) was an American socialite and clubwoman. She was a leader in various women's organizations, serving as president of the Miami Women's Club from 1938 to 1939 and as president general of the United Daughters of the Confederacy from 1957 to 1960. In 1962, Wittichen founded the Southern Dames of America and served as the society's honorary president.

== Biography ==
Wittichen was elected as the president of the Miami Women's Club in 1938. During her first year in office, the club's building was faced with foreclosure. Owing to her efforts, the club secured its permanent home in a five-story building.

She served as the president of the Florida Division of the United Daughters of the Confederacy from 1952 to 1954. In 1954, she advocated for referring to the American Civil War as the "War Between the States" and falsely claimed that the Confederate States of America was a separate nation from the United States instead of an unrecognized breakaway within the Union. She served on the committee responsible for organizing the annual General Convention of the Children of the Confederacy. In 1957, she was elected as President General of the United Daughters of the Confederacy, and served in that capacity until 1960. Shortly after her election, the United Daughters of the Confederacy were faced with a $30,000 deficit on their new headquarters, the Memorial to the Women of the Confederacy in Richmond, Virginia. Wittichen called the society's executive committee together for emergency action and asked every member of the UDC to contribute $1.00 towards paying off the deficit. The new headquarters was paid off in 1958.

In 1962, she founded the Southern Dames of America, a lineage society for women of Southern heritage that supports ophthalmic research.

She was made a Kentucky Colonel in 1965.

Wittichen was also a member of the Daughters of the American Revolution, the National Society of Daughters of Founders and Patriots of America, the Daughters of Colonial Wars, and the Order of the First Families of Virginia.

She lived in Coral Gables, Florida. She and her husband, Murray Forbes Wittichen, were charter members of the Historical Association of Southern Florida.
