= Crutcher =

Crutcher is a surname. Notable people with the surname include:

- Bettye Crutcher (1939–2022), American songwriter
- Brian Crutcher (b. 1934), English speedway rider
- Chris Crutcher (b. 1946), American novelist
- John Crutcher (1916–2017), American politician
- Mark Crutcher (1948–2023), American anti-abortion advocate
- Nelma Crutcher (1950–2022), President General of the United Daughters of the Confederacy
- Ronald Crutcher (b. 1947), American educator and musician
- Terence Crutcher (1976–2016), black man fatally shot by a white police officer in Tulsa, Oklahoma, in 2016

== See also ==
- Gibson, Dunn, & Crutcher, law firm
