= Corinne Hoch =

American historian and clubwoman

Vice President General of the United Daughters of the Confederacy
- In office 2004–2006

Personal details
- Born: Corinne Pate McLaurin North Carolina
- Spouse: Gregory C. Hoch
- Education: Appalachian State University; Salem College

Corinne Pate McLaurin Hoch is an American clubwoman and historian. She served as Vice President General of the United Daughters of the Confederacy. She authored the book Woodlawn Plantation, An Enchanced Memoir, 1518-1980.

== Early life and education ==
Hoch is originally from North Carolina. She is a great-great-granddaughter of Lieutenant Colonel James Thomas Weaver, a Confederate officer who died before the Battle of Murfreesboro during the American Civil War. She joined the Children of the Confederacy in 1954.

She studied art education, art history, and studio art at Appalachian State University and Salem College.

== Career and civic roles ==
Hoch worked in technology at Columbia University. She served as a university administrator.

She is a member of the United Daughters of the Confederacy and served as the organization's vice president general in 2005. She researched 1,500 Confederate prisoners of war and accounted for the deaths and burials of 1,300 of them.

Hoch is also member of the Daughters of the American Revolution and served as regent of the Gold Chapter. She serves as secretary of the South Carolina American Revolution Trust. In 2026, she wrote a book on Woodlawn Plantation titled Woodlawn Plantation, An Enhanced Memoir, 1518-1980.

== Personal life ==
Hoch is married to Gregory C. Hoch. They have a daughter, Laurin Jennings Hoch. The Hoch family lived in Montclair, New Jersey before moving to Murrells Inlet, South Carolina.

She is a member of Belin Memorial United Methodist Church in Murrells Inlet.
