= Likins =

Likins is a surname. Notable people with the surname include:

- Jamie Likins, American lineage society leader
- Peter Likins (born 1936), American academic administrator
- Rose M. Likins (born 1959), American diplomat
- Bob Likins (1921–1962), American javelin thrower
