= Mabel Sessions Dennis =

American newspaper editor and socialite

President General of the United Daughters of the Confederacy
- In office 1953–1955
- Preceded by: Cecile Brawley Long

Personal details
- Born: Mabel Claire Sessions; June 18, 1895 De Soto, Georgia, U.S.
- Died: April 8, 1990 (aged 94) Atlanta, Georgia, U.S.
- Spouse: Archibald Belmont Dennis
- Children: 3
- Occupation: newspaper editor publisher

Mabel Claire Sessions Dennis (née Sessions; June 18, 1895 – April 8, 1990), also known as Mrs. Belmont Davis, was an American newspaper editor, publisher, and socialite. She served as President General of the United Daughters of the Confederacy from 1953 to 1955 and organized the Children of the Confederacy as an national auxiliary of the United Daughters of the Confederacy in 1954. Upon the death of her husband in 1961, she took over as editor and co-publisher of The Covington News.

== Biography ==
Dennis was born in De Soto, Georgia. She was the daughter of William John Sessions and Ellen Luke.

She was a member of the Woman's Club of Covington, Georgia.

Dennis was active in the United Daughters of the Confederacy, a lineage-based service organization for women who are descended from Confederate soldiers of the American Civil War, and held many positions within the organization including National Chairman of Pages, 3rd Vice President, and President of the UDC's Georgia Division. In the 1950s, she and Mrs. Hollis Imes, Mrs. William Harlee, and Senator John C. Stennis officiated the dedication of Jefferson Davis Memorial Park at Fort Monroe in Hampton, Virginia.

From 1953 to 1955, she served as the President General of the United Daughters of the Confederacy. In 1954, she organized the Children of the Confederacy as a youth auxiliary of the United Daughters of the Confederacy that admitted children under the age of eighteen who could provide proof of descent from a Confederate soldier. In November 1954, during the UDC's national convention, she called on the organization's delegates to denounce communism, to "stamp out the Red threat", and place "God first in every life".

She was married to Archibald Belmont Dennis, who was the owner of The Covington News and served as National Commander of the Sons of Confederate Veterans. They had three children. Upon her husband's death in 1961, she took over as editor of The Covington News and became a co-publisher of the paper alongside Mrs. Mallard.
