= Elizabeth Cody Bachman =

American clubwoman

President General of the United Daughters of the Confederacy
- In office 1960–1962
- Preceded by: Kathryn Slaughter Wittichen

Personal details
- Born: Elizabeth Cody Ellis; August 17, 1898 Knoxville, Tennessee, U.S.
- Died: January 24, 1985 (aged 86) Alexandria, Virginia, U.S.
- Spouse: Robert G. Bachman

Elizabeth Cody Ellis Bachman (August 17 1898 – January 24, 1985) was an American clubwoman who served as President General of the United Daughters of the Confederacy from 1960 to 1962.

== Biography ==
Bachman was the daughter of Joseph N. Ellis and Francenia Laird Ellis. She was one of six children and grew up in Knoxville, Tennessee.

She was a member of the Daughters of the American Revolution and the United Daughters of the Confederacy. She served as President of the Tennessee Division of the United Daughters of the Confederacy before she was elected as the organization's President General, serving in that capacity from 1960 to 1962.

While serving as the United Daughters of the Confederacy's General Chairman of the Preservation of the Confederate Records in the National Archives Committee, Bachman led efforts to petition the United States Congress to designate funds for the microfilming of Confederate records within the United States National Archives and Records Administration. She corresponded with Senator John C. Stennis of Mississippi, who offered to introduce the bill to Congress and secure support in the United States Senate.

Bachman died in 1985.
