= Pamela Veuleman Trammell =

President General of the United Daughters of the Confederacy

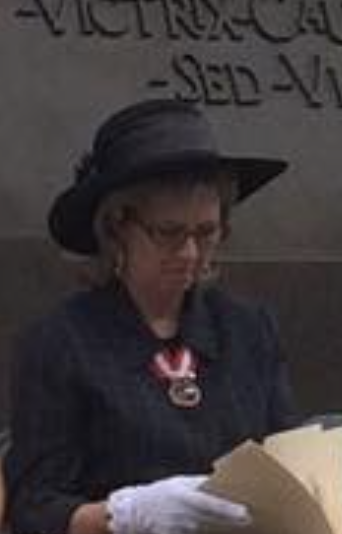
- Trammell in 2016

President General of the United Daughters of the Confederacy
- In office 2014–2016
- Preceded by: Jamie Likins
- Succeeded by: Patricia M. Bryson

Personal details
- Born: Pamela Karen Veuleman
- Spouse: Jay Trammell

Pamela Karen Veuleman Trammell is an American historian and clubwoman who served as the President General of the United Daughters of the Confederacy from 2014 to 2016.

== Career ==
Trammell was installed as the President General of the United Daughters of the Confederacy in 2014. She is the third president general, after Annie Guinn Massey and Jeanne Fox Weinmann, from Arkansas. She was the first president general from Arkansas in sixty eight years. Trammell was honored at .

In 2016, Trammell presented a charter to the newly formed Captain William Harrison Earp Chapter of the United Daughters of the Confederacy at the Polk County Library in Arkansas.

She authored the genealogy book The Descendants of the Dyess Brothers of Barnwell, South Carolina.

== Personal life ==
Trammell is from Texarkana, Arkansas. She is the daughter of Margie Mae Irby Rambin and Luther Charles Veuleman.
