= Patricia M. Bryson =

President General of the United Daughters of the Confederacy

President General of the United Daughters of the Confederacy
- In office 2016–2018
- Preceded by: Pamela Veuleman Trammell
- Succeeded by: Nelma Crutcher

Patricia M. Bryson is an American clubwoman who served as the President General of the United Daughters of the Confederacy from 2016 to 2018.

== Biography ==
Bryson is an active member of the United Daughters of the Confederacy and has worked on various initiatives to preserve American and Confederate history. She served as the organization's president general from 2016 to 2018.

Following the violence during the Unite the Right rally in Charlottesville, Virginia in August 2017, Bryson released a statement on behalf of the United Daughters of the Confederacy that denounced individuals and groups that promote racial divisiveness and white supremacy and spoke out against hate groups that use the Confederate flag and other symbols as their own. She went on to say that the UDC spent "123 years honoring [Confederate soldiers] by various activities in the fields of education, history and charity, promoting patriotism and good citizenship,” and that the organization's members, “stayed quietly in the background, never engaging in public controversy."

Bryson is also a member of the Daughters of the American Revolution.
