= Miami Women's Club =

- U.S. National Register of Historic Places
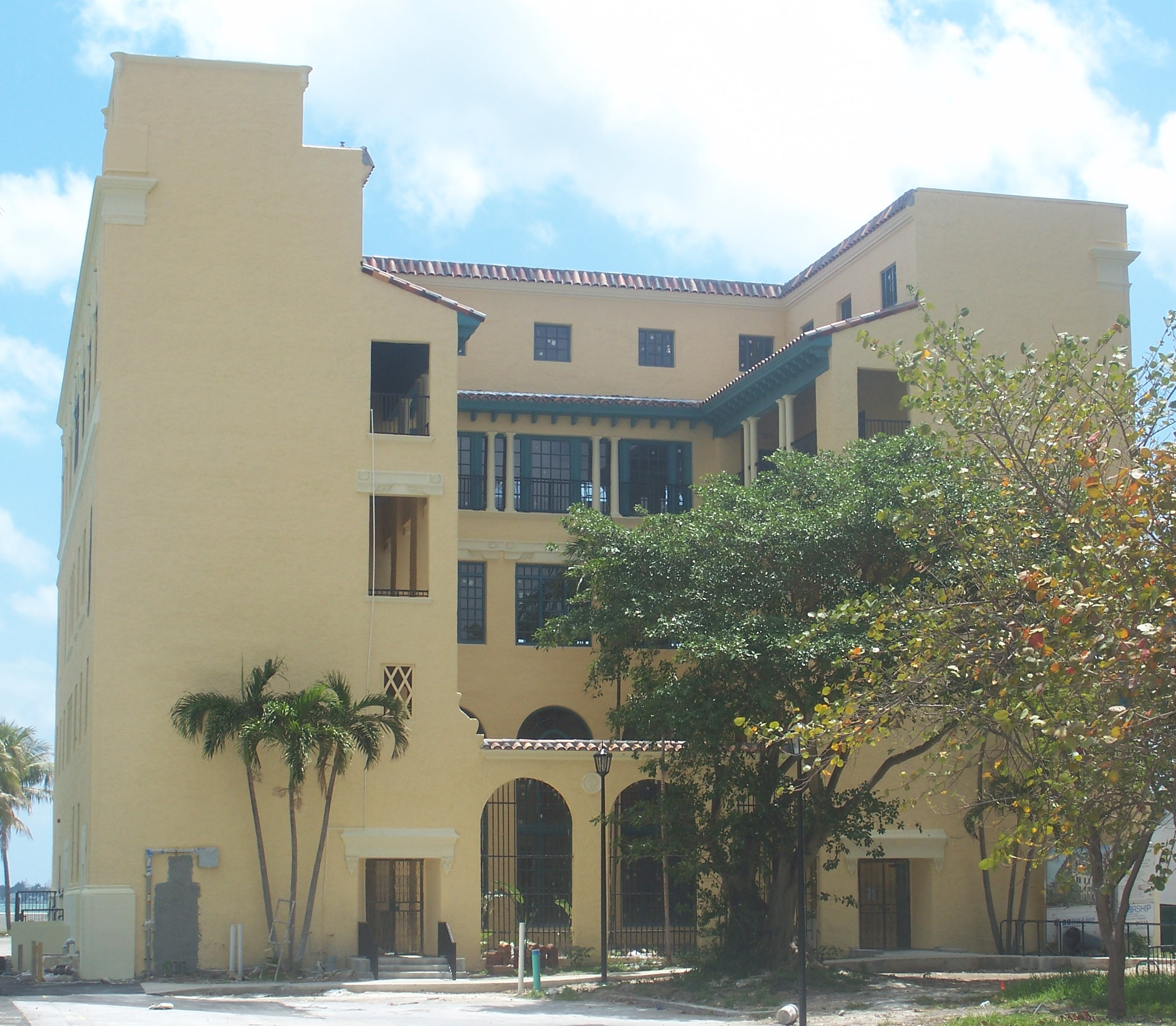

- Location within Miami Location within Florida Location within the United States
- Location: Miami, Florida
- Coordinates: 25°47′31.8402″N 80°11′9.6138″W
- NRHP reference No.: 74002257
- Added to NRHP: December 27, 1974

The Miami Women's Club is a historic site in Miami, Florida. It is located at 1737 North Bayshore Drive. On December 27, 1974, it was added to the U.S. National Register of Historic Places.

The organization has faced problems in restoring its historic headquarters. Later in the 2010s and in 2023, plans turned to making it a themed restaurant owing to the historical ambiance.

== History ==
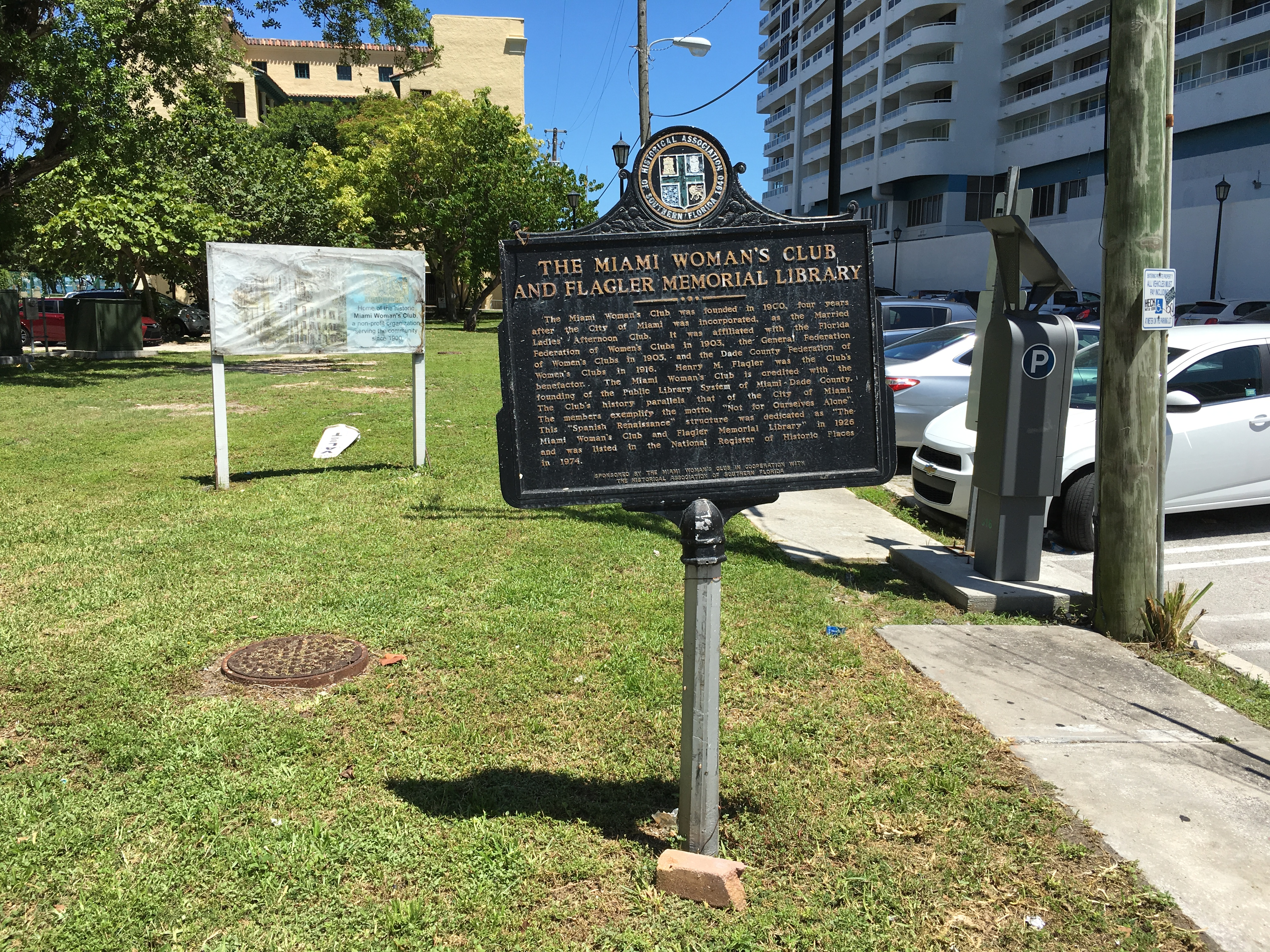
Historical plaque with history.

The Miami Women's Club organizes and participates in a variety of civic and community service activities in the Miami area. It also played a lead role in establishing public libraries in Miami.

The club formed in 1900 when a group of women began meeting weekly to socialize and read. They drew up an official constitution in September of that year, as the Married Ladies’ Afternoon Club. In 1902, club members voted to emphasize the literary nature of the club and began to circulate books for $1.50 per year to non-members.

The club grew to 80 members by 1903, when it joined the State Federation of Woman's Clubs. In 1906, the club changed its name to the Miami Woman's Club. Henry Flagler and the Model Land Company donated land at the corner of Royal Palm Park for a club building in 1912, with the stipulation that the building must also be used as a public library and free reading room. Club membership continued to grow, and by 1916, the Miami Woman's Club was the largest woman's club in the state.

In 1923, the Miami Woman's Club opened a children's library, and sold the building at Royal Palm Park. The club purchased a site for its new facilities at Bay Shore Drive and NE 17th Terrace, and selected August Geiger as the architect for the building, which opened in 1926. The building was named the Flagler Memorial Library and Woman's Club, and is still used by the club.

In 1924, the City of Miami began paying the operating expenses for the library, and in 1942, it took over management of the Flagler Library and other area branch libraries. The club's Library Committee continued to serve in an advisory capacity.

With a mission of supporting education and community stewardship, the Miami Woman's Club participates in numerous civic and community service activities. To facilitate its work, the club includes the following departments and committees: Arts Department, Conservation Department, Education Department, Home Life Department, International Affairs Department, Public Affairs Department, Budget Committee, Hospitality Committee, House Committee, Telephone Committee, Library Committee, Program Committee, Revisions Committee, Special Improvement Committee, Advisory Board, Cashier, Trustees, and Yearbook.

== Notable members ==
- Kathryn Slaughter Wittichen, served as club president from 1938 to 1939

== Works or publications ==
- Miami Woman's Club (Miami, Fla.); Crow, Lon Worth, Mrs, History of the Miami Woman's Club, 1900-1955, Miami, Fla., OCLC 1593952
- Miami Woman's Club (Miami, Fla.) (1954), The Miami Woman's Club Cook Book : Personal Recipes from the Kitchen Notebooks of Its Members, Miami, Fla.: The Club, OCLC 8546051
- Gmeinder, Charles L.; PALMM (Project); Miami (Fla.). Commission; Miami Woman's Club (Miami, Fla.) (1937), [City of Miami Flag Design and Related Correspondence], OCLC 54890550
