= The Covington News =

Newspaper in Covington, Georgia

- May 28, 2008 edition of The Covington (GA) News
- Type: Biweekly newspaper
- Owner: Patrick Graham
- Publisher: Patrick Graham
- Managing editor: Evan Newton
- Founded: 1865
- Headquarters: 1166 Usher Street NW. Covington, Georgia 30014; United States
- Circulation: 4,015 (as of 2013)
- Website: covnews.com

The Covington News is a newspaper serving Covington, Georgia and surrounding Newton County including the towns of Oxford, Porterdale and Social Circle. The newspaper publishes a bi-weekly paper on Sunday and Wednesday.

== History ==
A newspaper called The Georgia Enterprise was first published in 1865, six months after the end of The Civil War, by William L. Beebe. In 1902, this paper merged with its competitor, The Covington Star, to become The Enterprise under the ownership of Charles G. Smith.

The Enterprise was sold in 1908 to Lon. L. Flowers, and its name was changed to The Covington News. The newspaper had a number of owners between 1908 and 1931, when it was purchased by Belmont Dennis and his family. In 1957, the Dennis family absorbed the Covington paper The Citizen Observer. Upon the death of Belmont Dennis in December 1961, his widow, Mabel Sessions Dennis, became editor and co-publisher with Mrs. Mallard. In 1974 Leo S. Mallard became president and editor.

In 1983, the newspaper was sold to the company's employees, who owned it for three years. In 1986 it was sold to Morris Multimedia of Savannah, Georgia. The Covington News also publishes The News and Advertiser. In 2017, Patrick Graham purchased The Covington News from Morris Multimedia. Graham also owns The Walton Tribune in Monroe, Georgia.
