= Rassie Hoskins White =

11th President General of the United Daughters of the Confederacy

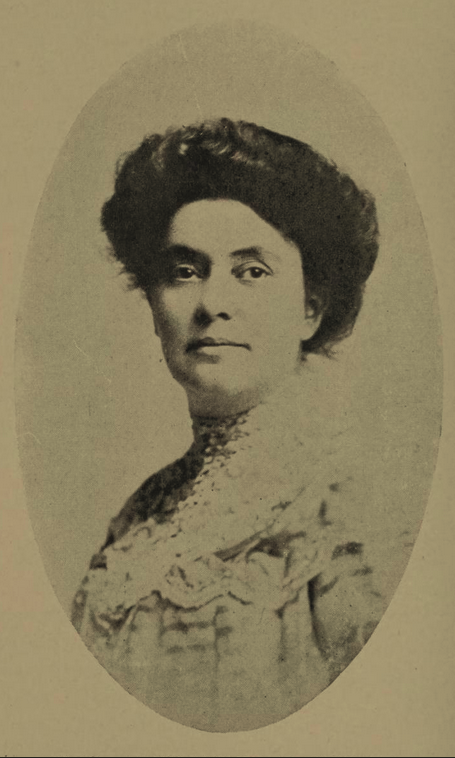
- White circa 1920

11th President General of the United Daughters of the Confederacy
- In office 1911–1913
- Preceded by: Virginia Faulkner McSherry
- Succeeded by: Daisy McLaurin Stevens

Personal details
- Born: Rassie M. Hoskins; December 9, 1862 Lexington, Mississippi, U.S.
- Died: September 14, 1944 (aged 81) Milledgeville, Georgia, U.S.
- Spouse: Alexander B. White
- Parents: E. Hoskins (father); Lou Pinkton (mother)
- Occupation: clubwoman

Rassie M. Hoskins White (December 9, 1862 – September 14, 1944), also known as Mrs. Alexander B. White, was an American socialite and clubwoman who served as President General of the United Daughters of the Confederacy from 1911 to 1913. During her term, she proposed the construction of the Jefferson Davis Highway.

== Early life and family ==
White was born in Lexington, Mississippi to Captain Captain E. Hoskins, a Confederate officer, and Lou Pinkston Hoskins. Her parents were slaveowners. During the Civil War, her father volunteered to serve in Company A of the 38th Mississippi Infantry Regiment and fought in multiple battles in Mississippi, including the Siege of Vicksburg. He was in General Nathan Bedford Forrest's calvary during the siege and was discharged in 1865. White's mother knitted socks and scraped bandages for Confederate soldiers and made her slaves work on the fortifications surrounding Vicksburg.

== Women's clubs ==
White was involved in the women's club movement. She was the founder and president of the Fortnightly Club and was a member of the Sans Souci Club, the Woman's Club, the Daughters of the American Revolution, and the United Daughters of the Confederacy.

=== United Daughters of the Confederacy ===
White became deeply involved in the United Daughters of the Confederacy and was the first delegate that the Fifth Tennessee Regenment UDC Chapter of Paris, Tennessee sent to a national convention. She served as chapter president and Second Vice President of the Tennessee Division UDC before being elected President of the Tennessee Division UDC. During her term as Division President, from 1905 to 1907, twenty-three chapters were organized. She then served as the UDC's Chairwoman of the Committee on Recommendations, Finance and Revision of Constitution. In 1905, the delegates voted to allocate her $500 for the Sam Davis Statue in Nashville, Tennessee and approved her request for a Confederate monument at Shiloh National Military Park. She was named The Director General of the UDC, a position she held until 1918. While serving as Director General, she was elected to serve as President General of the United Daughters of the Confederacy, an office she held from 1911 to 1913. During her presidency, she supported the executive committee of the Arlington Confederate Monument Association. In 1912, during her term, the United Daughters of the Confederacy met for the first time outside of the Southern States, at the Daughters of the American Revolution's Memorial Continental Hall in Washington, D.C., to prepare to place the cornerstone for the Confederate monument in Arlington. President William H. Taft addressed the assembly. White was unable to attend the event due to her husband's declining health, and so she sent Mrs. Frank G. Odenheimer, First Vice-President of the UDC, in her place to thank President Taft on behalf of the organization.

In 1913, she proposed the construction of the Jefferson Davis Highway.

In 1918, she served as chairwoman of the UDC Committee for children's auxiliaries and was editor of the UDC's Department of the Confederate Veteran in 1919.

In 1923, when the UDC proposed the Mammy memorial, White endorsed the proposal claiming it was a way of making visible Black women’s behind-the-scenes work on behalf of the Confederate cause.

== Personal life ==
After the death of her father, White and her mother moved to Meridian, Mississippi. She married Alexander B. White, a banker and philanthropist from Paris, Tennessee, in 1890.
