= Laura Martin Rose =

Historian and Ku Klux Klan propagandist (1862–1917)

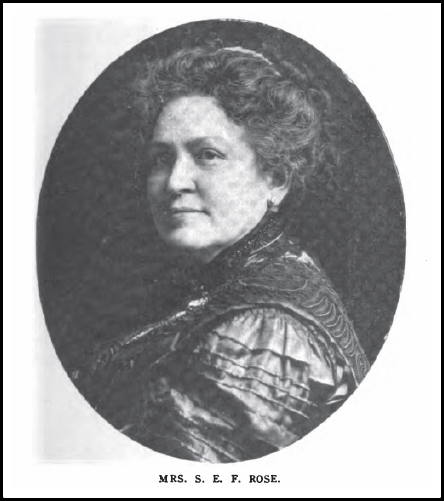
- Born: Laura Marcella Martin; September 18, 1862; Crescent View, Giles County, Tennessee
- Died: May 6, 1917 (aged 54); Birmingham, Alabama
- Other names: Mrs. S. E. F. Rose
- Occupation: Historian
- Known for: Ku Klux Klan propaganda
- Notable work: The Ku Klux Klan, or Invisible Empire

Laura Martin Rose (September 18, 1862 – May 6, 1917) (born Laura Marcella Martin), known professionally as Mrs. S. E. F. Rose, was a historian and propagandist for the Ku Klux Klan employed by the United Daughters of the Confederacy.

== Biography ==
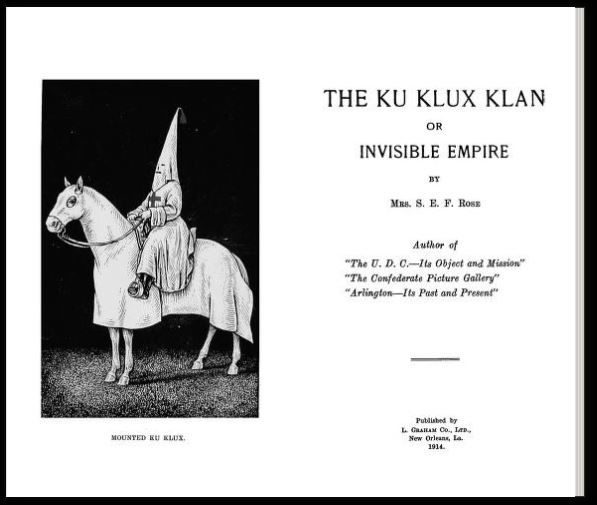
Title pages of "The Ku Klux Klan or Invisible Empire" (1914) by Laura Martin Rose.

Rose was born in 1862 near Pulaski, Tennessee, the town where the Ku Klux Klan would be formed three years later. After her marriage to Solon Edward Franklin Rose, she often identified herself with her husband's name, as Mrs. S. E. F. Rose.

Rose wrote a pamphlet, called Origins of the Ku Klux Klan, sold as a fundraiser by the United Daughters of the Confederacy, of which she was Mississippi division president. The funds were to be used to erect a Confederate monument at Jefferson Davis's home. The pamphlet promoted the Lost Cause narrative of the American Civil War and presented racist acts of violence as heroism.

Encouraged by the success of the pamphlet, Rose expanded it into a textbook titled The Ku Klux Klan, or Invisible Empire. Rose justified Klan violence by claiming it was a last resort in response to supposed African American racial violence, and to encourage southern boys, if deemed necessary, to commit acts violence against African American men to defend the virtue of white southern women. The book was one part of a broad campaign to insert false Confederate narratives of the "Lost Cause", glorification of the KKK, and minimalization of the role of slavery in the Civil War, into public school curriculums in the South, so as to uphold institutionalized white supremacy. It was unanimously endorsed by the United Daughters of the Confederacy at their 1913 annual convention in New Orleans, and again at their 1915 annual convention in San Francisco, and by the Sons of Confederate Veterans in Jacksonville in 1914, with aim of promoting it in schools throughout the American South. It was frequently promoted in Confederate Veteran, the official organ of the United Confederate Veterans.

Rose succeeded Mildred Rutherford as historian-general of the United Daughters of the Confederacy in 1916. She died in 1917.

Martin Methodist College (renamed University of Tennessee Southern in 2021) was named for her grandfather Thomas Martin (1799–1870), who established the college in his will. As her book describes, some of the earliest meetings of the Klan were held at her grandfather's house.

== Re-founding of the Klan ==
Rose's 1914 textbook contributed to mythologizing and glorifying the Ku Klux Klan, which at that time was a nearly-extinct regional organization. It was one of a number of works of the era that would lead to the Klan's re-founding in 1915.

According to journalist Michelle Serrano, Rose's textbook served to propagate white supremacy and helped to bring about the Jim Crow era of racist laws.
