= Brandon Cemetery =

United States historic place in Mississippi

- U.S. National Register of Historic Places
- Mississippi Landmark
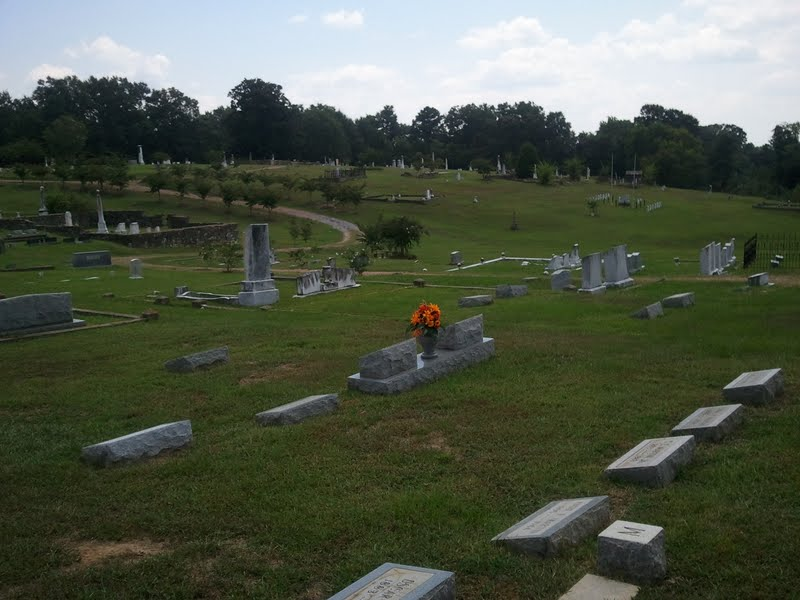
- Old Brandon Cemetery

- Location within Mississippi Location within the United States
- Location: Northeast of Downtown Brandon Historic District; Brandon, Mississippi
- Coordinates: 32°16′33″N 89°59′31″W
- Built: 1831
- NRHP reference No.: 10000925

Significant dates
- Added to NRHP: November 18, 2010
- Designated USMS: February 08, 2007

Brandon Cemetery (commonly referred to as Old Brandon Cemetery) is located in Brandon, Mississippi, northeast of the Downtown Brandon Historic District. It is an 8.8 acre cemetery originally platted in 1831. The cemetery contains over 1,000 marked graves, and was added to the National Register of Historic Places in 2010.

== Description ==
The cemetery is bordered by a cast-iron fence and a stand of magnolia trees. The earliest graves, from 1834, are located on the eastern side of the cemetery. Graves from 1854 can be found on the western side of the property. The center of the cemetery contains a monument and plot of Civil War era graves, erected by the Sons of Confederate Veterans, which contains the remains of over 200 Union and Confederate soldiers who fought in the Battle of Shiloh. One small mausoleum with a gabled roof contains the remains of members of an early local family. Other areas of the cemetery include family plots, marked by brick walls; graves of Yellow Fever epidemic victims; and un-inscribed headstones of unidentified early African American residents. The majority of the grave markers are rounded-top headstones. The cemetery also features a variety of ornate headstones; including statuary, sculptures and reliefs. Many of the decorative headstones incorporate symbols of fraternal organizations and religious imagery.

== Notable burials ==
- Patrick Henry (Mississippi politician)
- Robert Lowry (governor)
- Anselm J. McLaurin
- Daisy McLaurin Stevens

== Current status ==
The cemetery is considered active, as there are still plots available for sale. Recent efforts have been made to improve upkeep of the cemetery, including landscaping and new fencing. The cemetery can be viewed by the public during the day, from sunrise to sunset.
