= Daisy McLaurin Stevens =

12th President General of the United Daughters of the Confederacy

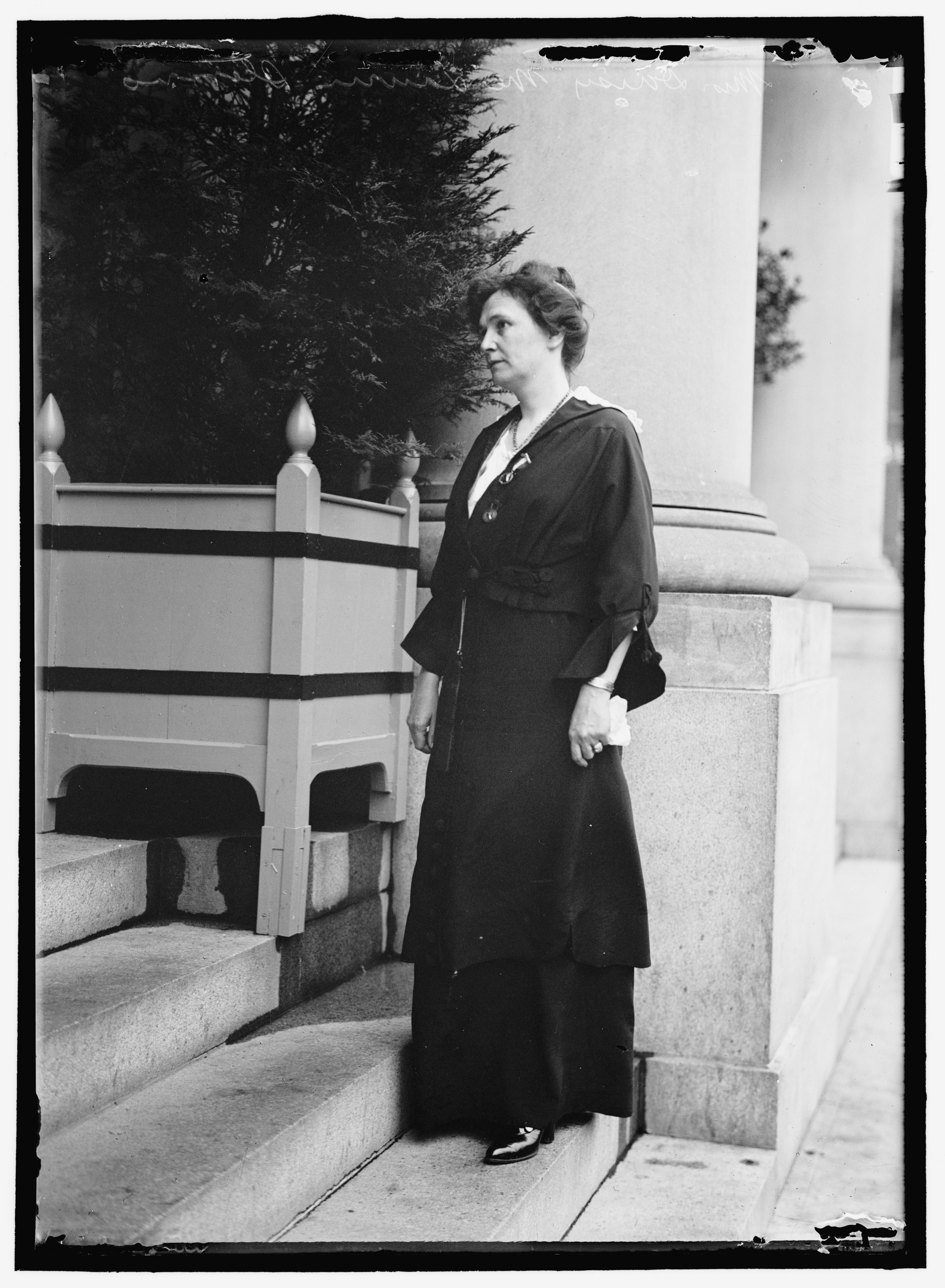
- Stevens in 1914

12th President General of the United Daughters of the Confederacy
- In office 1913–1915
- Preceded by: Rassie Hoskins White

Personal details
- Born: June 21, 1875 Raleigh, Mississippi, U.S.
- Died: July 31, 1950 (aged 75)
- Resting place: Brandon Cemetery
- Spouse: William Forrest Stevens
- Parents: Anselm J. McLaurin (father); Laura Rauch (mother)

Daisy McLaurin Stevens (June 21, 1875 – July 31, 1950) was an American socialite who served as president general of the United Daughters of the Confederacy. She presented the Confederate Memorial at Arlington National Cemetery to President Woodrow Wilson in 1914. Stevens was the daughter of Mississippi governor and senator Anselm J. McLaurin.

== Early life and family ==
Stevens was born on June 21, 1875 in Raleigh, Mississippi. Her father, the Confederate veteran Anselm J. McLaurin, served as the 34th governor of Mississippi and then as a United States senator. As a teenager, she lived at Ben Venue, an antebellum mansion in Brandon, Mississippi built in 1852 for Edmund Richardson, which her father purchased in 1888.

== United Daughters of the Confederacy ==
Stevens was an active member of the United Daughters of the Confederacy and held multiple leadership positions within the organization. While serving as president of the UDC's Mississippi Division, she gave an address at the dedication of the Rankin County Confederate Monument in Brandon, Mississippi on September 29, 1907.

She was elected president general of the United Daughters of the Confederacy, and served in that office from 1913 to 1915.

On June 4, 1914, Stevens officiated the unveiling of the Confederate Memorial at Arlington National Cemetery. The monument was presented to her by Colonel Hilary A. Herbert, former United States secretary of the Navy and the chairman of the executive committee of the Arlington Confederate Monument Association. She accepted the memorial and delivered a speech glorifying the heroism of the Confederate dead and praising the Confederate cause. Following her speech, she was presented with a bouquet of American Beauty roses by John Sharp Williams. Stevens then presented the memorial to President Woodrow Wilson as a gift to the American people. That evening, she was a member of the receiving party, along with Moses Jacob Ezekiel, William Jennings Bryan, Mary Baird Bryan, Cornelia Branch Stone, and Florence Faison Butler for the formal reception at the Pan American Union Building in Washington, D.C.

== Death ==
Stevens died on July 31, 1950. She was buried in Brandon Cemetery in Brandon, Mississippi.
