= Memorial to the Women of the Confederacy =

Historic building in Richmond, Virginia, United States

- United Daughters of the Confederacy
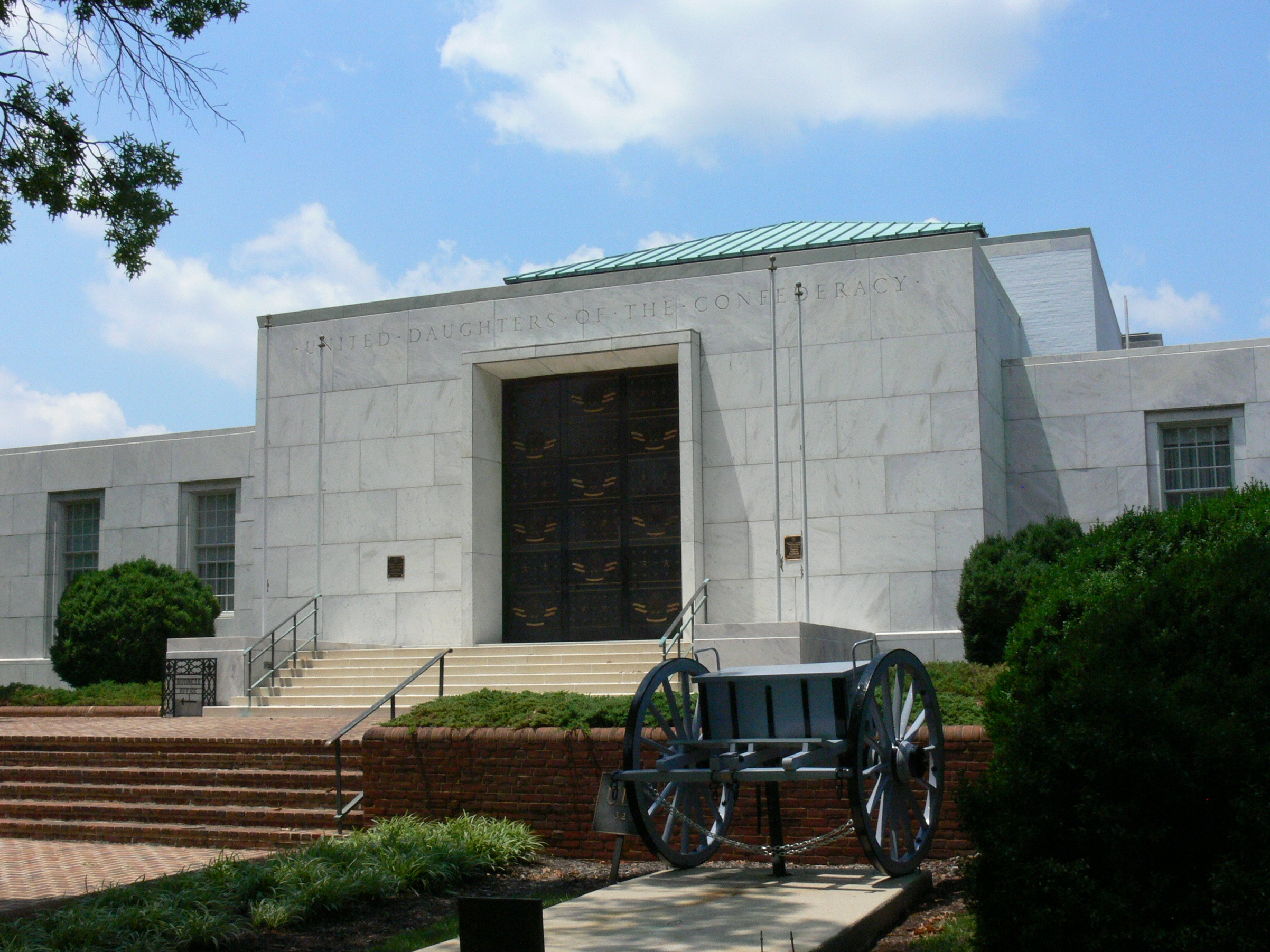
- Main façade of the Memorial Building
- For the women of the Confederate States of America
- Established: April 17, 1955
- Unveiled: November 11, 1957
- United Daughters of the Confederacy Memorial Building
- U.S. National Register of Historic Places
- Virginia Landmarks Register
- Location within Virginia Location within the United States
- Coordinates: 37°33′25″N 77°28′27″W
- Area: Less than one acre
- Built: 1955-1957
- Architectural style: Stripped Classical
- NRHP reference No.: 08000341
- VLR No.: 127-0398-0054

Significant dates
- Added to NRHP: April 24, 2008
- Designated VLR: December 5, 2007
- Location: 37°33′25″N 77°28′27″W; 328 North Arthur Ashe Boulevard, Richmond, Virginia, United States
- Designed by: Louis Ballou
- This building is erected to the glory of God and the memory of our Confederate mothers

The Memorial to the Women of the Confederacy, also known as the U.D.C. Memorial Building, is a historic building located in Richmond, Virginia, that serves as the national headquarters of the United Daughters of the Confederacy and their children's auxiliary, the Children of the Confederacy. It was listed on the United States National Register of Historic Places in 2008. The building is open to the public on scheduled days.

== History ==
The Memorial to the Women of the Confederacy is located at 328 North Arthur Ashe Boulevard, on the site of an old soldiers' home for veterans of the military forces of the Confederate States. The Park was created in 1934 by an act of the Assembly of Virginia. It was built between 1955 and 1957, and is a one-story, three part, marble-clad building in a stripped classical style. It features a double leaf, central entrance designed to resemble a mausoleum and with 17-foot high bronze doors composed of rectangular bronze panels. A two-story addition was made to the rear of the northwest corner of the building in 1996. It was constructed principally of Georgia marble, with entrance doors of architectural bronze decorated with the organization's badge. The walks are of red Virginia brick. There are also memorials to Confederate "heroes", to the women of the Confederacy, the co-founders of the organization, and a number of items from the camp of Robert E. Lee, a general in the Confederate States Army.

=== 2020 fire ===
The building was intentionally set on fire at about 1:30 am on May 30, 2020, during the George Floyd protests in Richmond, Virginia, following the murder of George Floyd. Reports from the fire department indicated that damage was limited to the headquarters' façade. Windows were broken and fire was set to the curtains hanging in the building's Caroline Meriwether Goodlett Library. Flames covered most of the front of the building. Nine fire trucks responded and the firefighters were able to extinguish the fire. A police line three blocks long protected the firefighting operation. The fire was largely contained to the library, but there was some smoke and water damage throughout the building.

== See also ==
- Confederate monuments
- Confederate Women's Monument, Baltimore
- Creole marble
- Ladies' Memorial Association
- List of monuments and memorials removed during the George Floyd protests
- National Register of Historic Places listings in Richmond, Virginia
- Neoclassical architecture
