= Caroline Meriwether Goodlett =

Founding president of the United Daughters of the Confederacy

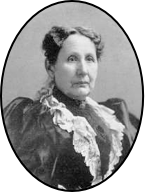

1st President General of the United Daughters of the Confederacy
- In role 1894–1895
- Preceded by: office created
- Succeeded by: Elizabeth Childress Brown

Personal details
- Born: Caroline Douglas Meriwether; November 3, 1833 Woodstock Plantation; Todd County, Kentucky; United States
- Died: October 16, 1914 (aged 80) Nashville, Tennessee; United States
- Resting place: Mount Olivet Cemetery
- Spouse(s): John Sturdevant (divorced); Michael Campbell Goodlett
- Children: 2
- Parent(s): Charles Nicholas Minor Meriwether; Caroline Huntley Barker
- Occupation: philanthropist
- Known for: Co-founding of the United Daughters of the Confederacy

Caroline Douglas Meriwether Goodlett (November 3, 1833 – October 16, 1914) was an American philanthropist and the founding president general of the United Daughters of the Confederacy.

== Early life and family ==
Goodlett was born on November 3, 1833, to Caroline Huntley Barker and Charles Nicholas Minor Meriwether at Woodstock, her family's plantation in Todd County, Kentucky.

On December 3, 1853, she married John Sturdevant. As a wedding present, her father gave her 300 acres of land near Woodstock, across the state line in Montgomery County, Tennessee. The property included a large two-story log house, where her father had lived prior to building Woodstock. Goodlett and Sturdevant had one child, a son named Charles James. The marriage was an unhappy one and the couple later divorced.

== Confederate philanthropy ==
At the beginning of the American Civil War, Goodlett's brother Edward enlisted to serve in the Confederate States Army. After his death in 1861, Goodlett focused on aiding the Confederacy. She converted her tobacco barns into workshops where women from her community would gather to make bandages and clothing for Confederate soldiers. Goodlett also provided nursing care to wounded soldiers housed on her estate until they were transferred to hospitals. Additionally, she brought medicine and other supplies to Confederate troops.

After the war, Goodlett sold her property and moved with her son to Nashville. In 1866 she founded the Benevolent Society with the purpose of funding medical treatments and artificial limbs for wounded Confederate veterans. She became a charter member of the Board of Confederate Monumental Association, funding the construction of Confederate monuments in Nashville.

In 1869 she married Colonel Michael Campbell Goodlett, a Confederate veteran officer and widower. Her husband was the brother of John A. Goodlett. They had one daughter, Caroline Barker Goodlett, who was born on October 3, 1871.

In 1893 she represented Tennessee as a commissioner at the World's Columbian Exposition in Chicago.

=== United Daughters of the Confederacy ===
Goodlett was elected president of The Auxiliary of the Confederate Soldiers' Home in Tennessee in 1890. The organization was established to assist widows, wives, and children of Confederate veterans. The Auxiliary later changed its name to The Daughters of the Confederacy in 1892. She served as the state president of the organization. She was unaware that, at this time, another society bearing the name "Daughters of the Confederacy" was being run by Anna Davenport Raines in Georgia. Goodlett and Raines were made aware of each other's organizations and joined them together, extending invitations to similar women' societies in Louisiana, Mississippi, and Missouri to create the National Association of the Daughters of the Confederacy. When the organization became a national organization in 1894, Goodlett was elected as the first president. In 1905 she was recognized as the organization's founder at the General Convention in San Francisco.

== Death ==
Goodlett died on October 16, 1914, and was buried in the family plot in Mount Olivet Cemetery in Nashville.
