= Nelma Crutcher =

President General of the United Daughters of the Confederacy

President General of the United Daughters of the Confederacy
- In office 2018–2020
- Preceded by: Patricia M. Bryson
- Succeeded by: Linda Edwards

Personal details
- Born: August 16, 1950
- Died: January 17, 2022; Dover, Tennessee, U.S.
- Education: Murray State University; University of Mississippi
- Occupation: clubwoman

Nelma Sue Crutcher (August 16, 1950 – January 17, 2022) was an American clubwoman who served as the President General of the United Daughters of the Confederacy from 2018 to 2020. Her presidency was marked by a movement calling for the removal of Confederate monuments and memorials across the United States.

== Early life and education ==
Nelma Sue Crutcher was born on August 16, 1950 to Alvin Earl Crutcher and Bonnie Sizemore Crutcher.

She graduated from Stewart County High School and attended Murray State University before completing her degree at the University of Mississippi.

== Career ==
Crutcher worked for Horizon Hospital in Dickson, Tennessee for over forty-two years. At the time of her retirement, she was the director of laboratory services.

=== United Daughters of the Confederacy ===
Crutcher was an active member of the Fort Donelson 1582 Chapter of the United Daughters of the Confederacy and held various leadership positions within the national society. She served as the Tennessee Division President of the UDC before serving as the national society's Second Vice President General. Crutcher acquired scholarships for students through the United Daughters of the Confederacy and played an instrumental role in obtaining a Tennessee State monument at Vicksburg National Military Park, which was dedicated on June 29, 1996. She placed seventy-seven grave markers in the cemetery at Vicksburg.

From 2018 to 2020, Crutcher served as the society's President General. Following a call for the removal of Confederate monuments and memorials in Alabama, Crutcher released a statement on behalf of the United Daughters of the Confederacy claiming that the UDC never engaged in public controversy and advocating for descendants of Confederate soldiers to be able to honor the memory of their ancestors. She also stated that Confederate veterans were Americans and that the United Daughters of the Confederacy does not "impose the standards of the 19th century on Americans of the 21st century."

In March 2019, she released a statement regarding the removal of the Confederate Soldiers Monument from Forsyth County Courthouse in Winston-Salem, North Carolina saying, "To some, these memorial statues and markers are viewed as divisive and thus unworthy of being allowed to remain in public places. To others, they simply represent a memorial to our forefathers who fought bravely during four years of war." She went on to condemn the use of Confederate images to promote hatred. She had previously made statements denouncing white supremacy.

== Personal life and death ==
Crutcher was a United Methodist and a parishioner of Taylor Chapel United Methodist Church in Dover. She volunteered with the Stewart County Completely One Ministries and the Stewart County Back to School Bash.

She died on January 17, 2022. She was buried in the Taylor Chapel Methodist Church Cemetery.
