= Children of the Confederacy =

American heritage association

- Abbreviation: CofC
- Established: 1896
- Founded at: Alexandria, Virginia, U.S.
- Type: charitable organization, lineage society
- Headquarters: Memorial to the Women of the Confederacy; 328 N Arthur Ashe Blvd; Richmond, Virginia, U.S.
- Members: 30,000 (2011)
- Website: official website

The Children of the Confederacy of the United Daughters of the Confederacy, more commonly known as the Children of the Confederacy (often abbreviated as CofC), is an American coed lineage society and hereditary association for children and teenagers who are descendants of veterans of the Confederate States Army and Confederate States Navy. It is an auxiliary organization to the United Daughters of the Confederacy (UDC) and promotes the pseudohistoral Lost Cause ideology.

== History ==
The first Children of the Confederacy chapter was organized in 1896 as a children's auxiliary. It was incorporated in 1897 in Alexandria, Virginia. In 1918, Rassie Hoskins White served as the United Daughters of the Confederacy's chairwoman of the committee for children's auxiliaries. The Children of the Confederacy was organized as a national society in the 1954 by UDC President General Mabel Sessions Dennis. Later that year, fourteen newly-established chapters were accepted at the UDC's 61st annual convention in Richmond, Virginia.

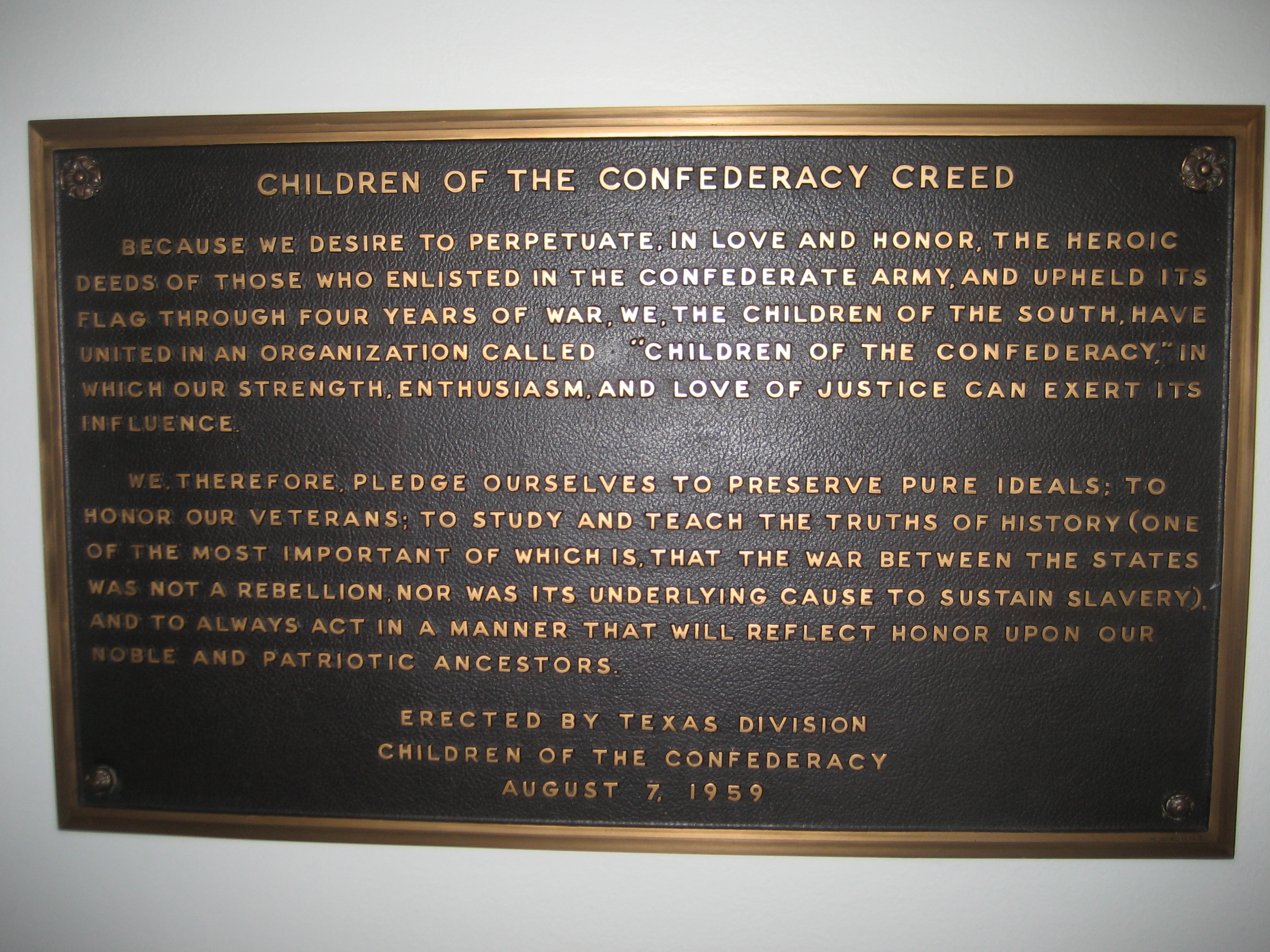
Plaque of the Creed of the Children of the Confederacy at the Texas State Capitol.

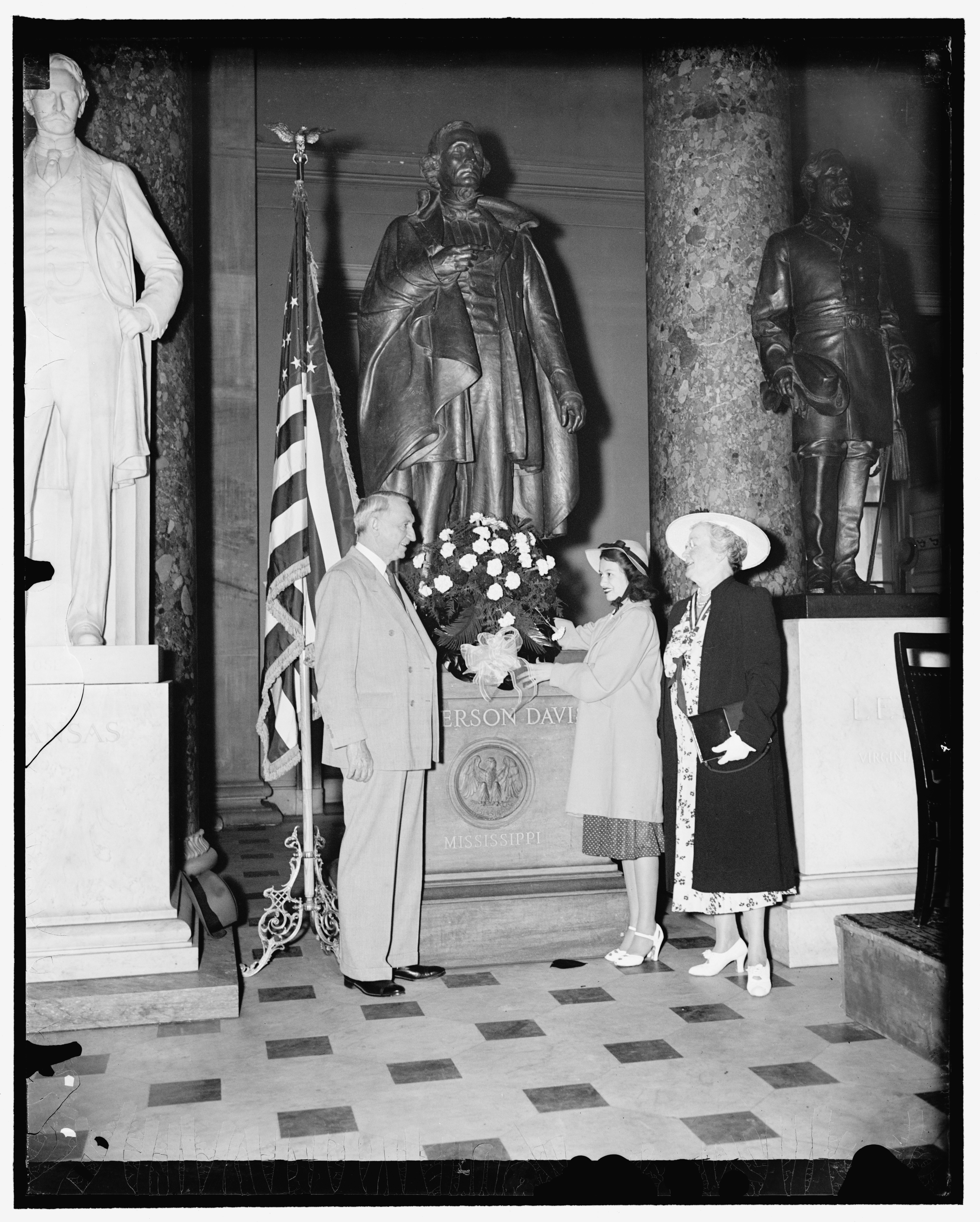
CofC officer Imogen Smith with Senator Walter F. George and Dorothy Blount Lamar placing a wreath at a statue of Jefferson Davis in 1938

The first General Convention of the Children of the Confederacy was held in Atlanta, Georgia, from August 26-27, 1955. Their second General Convention was held in Memphis, Tennessee from August 23-24, 1956.

Before 2015, the Creed of the Children of the Confederacy read:

Because we desire to perpetuate, in love and honor, the heroic deeds of those who enlisted in the Confederate Services and upheld its flag through four years of war, we, the children of the South, have united in an Organization called the "Children of the Confederacy," in which our strength, enthusiasm and love of justice can exert its influence. We therefore pledge ourselves to preserve pure ideals, to honor the memory of our beloved Veterans, to study and teach the truths of history (one of the most important of which is that the War Between the States was not a rebellion, nor was its underlying cause to sustain slavery), and always to act in a manner that will reflect honor upon our noble and patriotic ancestors.

The phrase "nor was its underlying cause to sustain slavery" was deleted by the UDC General Convention of 2015.

In 2019, the State Preservation Board of Texas, chaired by Governor Greg Abbott, unanimously voted in support of removing a plaque depicting the Children of the Confederacy Creed from the interior of the Texas State Capitol in Austin. The plaque was initially placed on August 7, 1959. It was the subject of debate within the Texas Legislature, with Republican House Speaker Joe Straus calling for its removal in 2017, a month after the Unite the Right rally in support of Confederate monuments in Charlottesville, Virginia led to the murder of a counterprotestor. The removal request was formally filed by Democrat Rep. Eric Johnson in October 2017.

In 2021, the youngest-ever member was inducted into the organization, when they were only 45 minutes old.

== Leadership ==
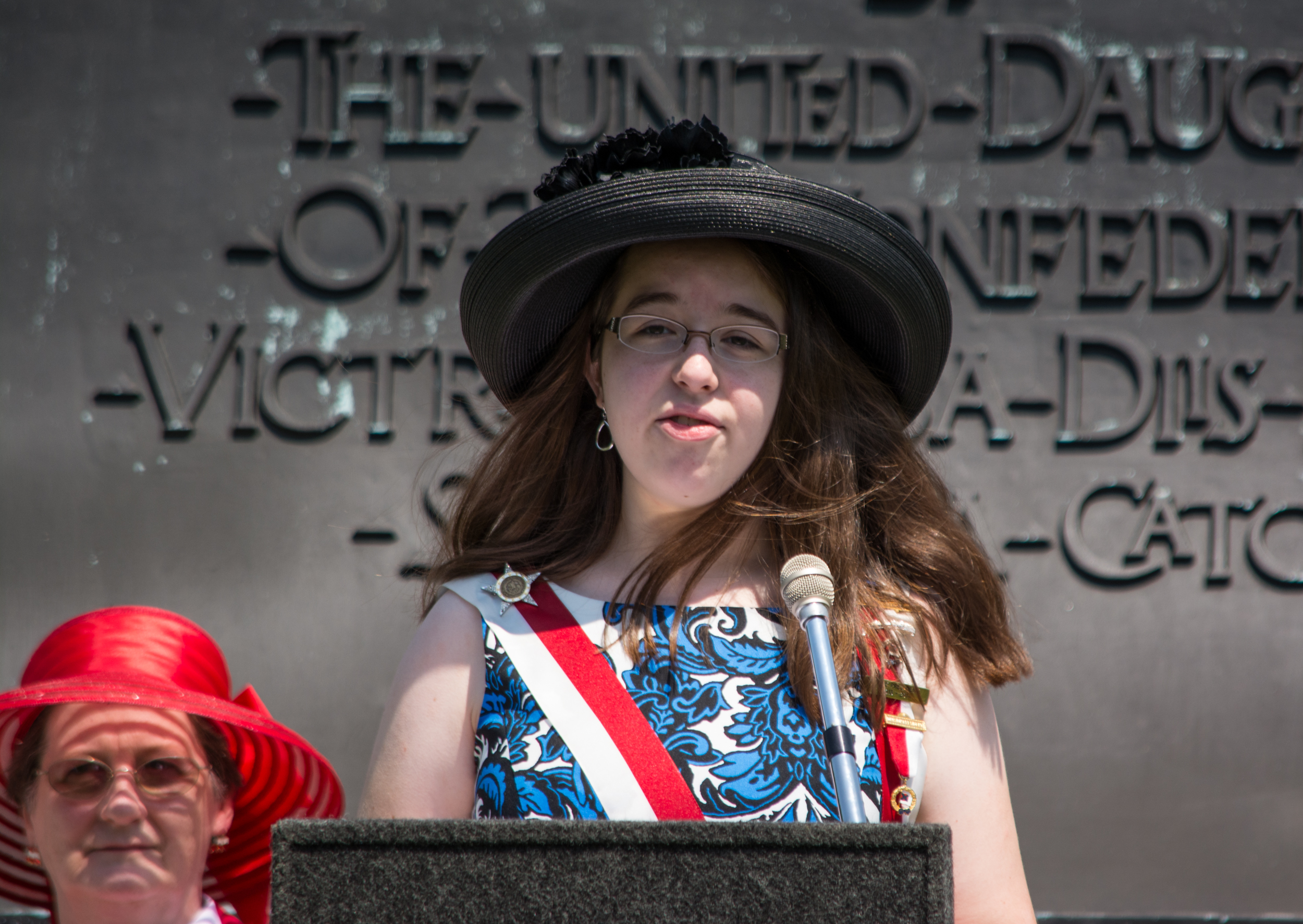
CofC President General Jessica Sizemore speaks at a Confederate Memorial Day service at Arlington National Cemetery in 2014.

The Children of the Confederacy is led by a President General, who is elected during the Annual General Conference of the Children of the Confederacy. UDC chapters sponsor all Children of the Confederacy chapters.

== Membership ==
Members must be direct or lateral descendants from someone who served in the Confederate States Army or the Confederate States Navy or provided aid to the Confederate States of America during the American Civil War. The organization's members are children from newly born through age 18. Members may go on to join the United Daughters of the Confederacy, the Sons of Confederate Veterans, and the Military Order of the Stars and Bars.

Members go on field trips to historic sites pertaining to the American Civil War and the Confederate States of America, visit Veterans' hospitals, deliver packages to active duty United States military personnel, and clean up Confederate cemeteries. They are taught Lyon Gardiner Tyler's Catechism on the History of the Confederate States of America, 1861–1865, which says that Northerners did away with slavery because the climate was unsuitable, that they had no intention of ever paying the South for its slaves after abolition, that slaves in the South were faithful to their owners, who were caring and gentle people: cruel slave owners existed only in the North.

As of 2011, the organization had over 30,000 members.

== Notable members ==
- Corinne Hoch, UDC Vice President General

== See also ==
- Children of the American Revolution
