= Jamie Likins =

American clubwoman

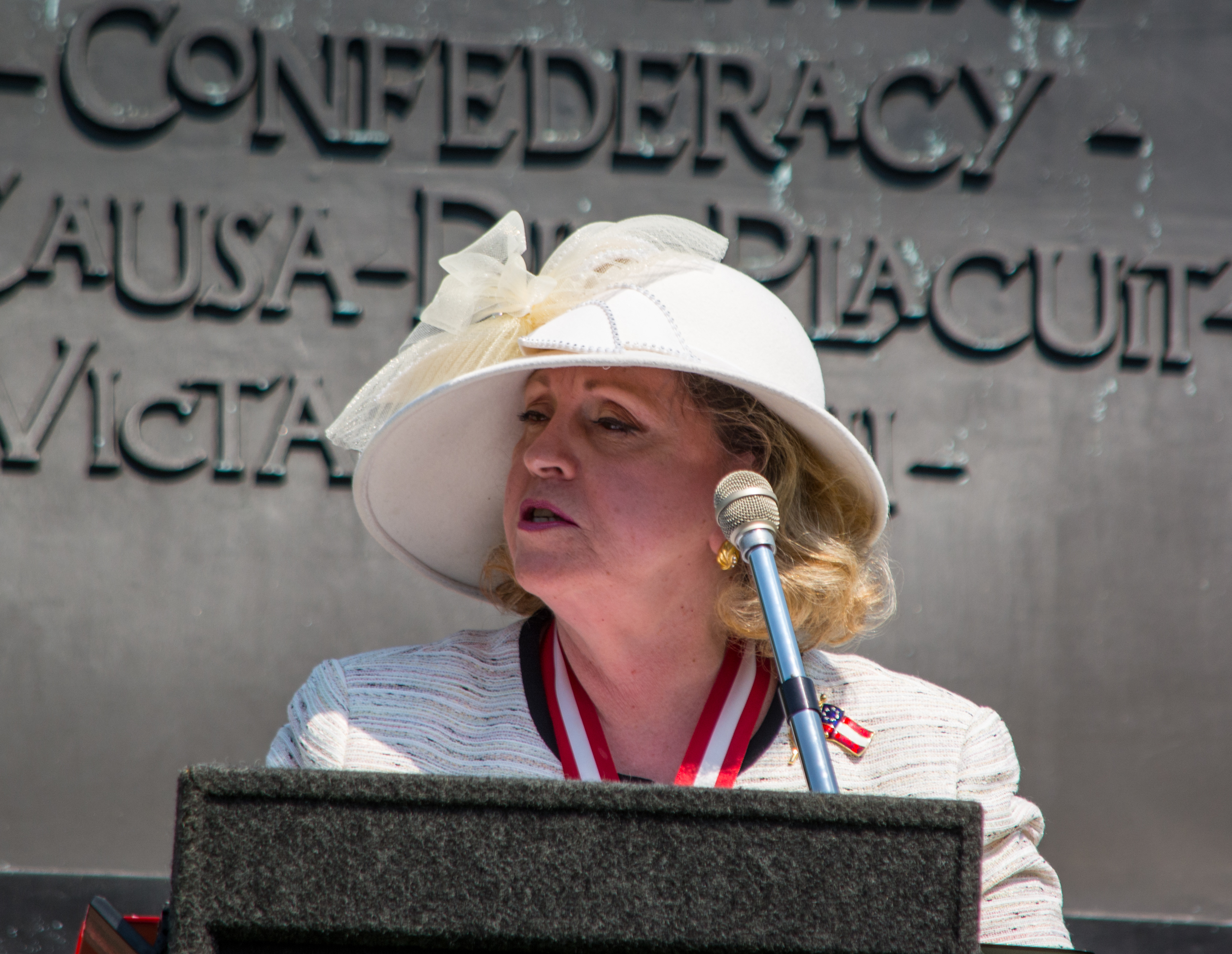
- Likins in 2014

President General of the United Daughters of the Confederacy
- In office 2012–2014
- Preceded by: Martha Rogers Van Schaick
- Succeeded by: Pamela Veuleman Trammell

Vice President General of the United Daughters of the Confederacy
- In office 2008–2010

Personal details
- Spouse: Roy W. Likins
- Occupation: clubwoman

Jamesene E. "Jamie" Likins is an American clubwoman who served as the President General of the United Daughters of the Confederacy from 2012 to 2014.

== Biography ==
Likins served as Vice President General of the United Daughters of the Confederacy from 2008 to 2010, during the presidency of Jane Durden. She went on to serve as the President General of the United Daughters of the Confederacy from 2012 to 2014.

In 2013, she presided over the General Convention of the UDC in Tulsa, Oklahoma. That same year, in September, she honored James Welton Carpenter with a Cross of Military Service, presented by the Toccoa Chapter No. 1294 of the United Daughters of the Confederacy.

In June 2014, she attended a program hosted by the Tom Jounson Chapter UDC. She was part of a wreath laying ceremony at Mt. Olive Cemetery in Overton County, Tennessee in July 2014. Likins laid a wreath on the grave of Confederate Army veteran and sculptor Moses Jacob Ezekiel in Arlington National Cemetery on Confederate Memorial Day in 2014.

She was succeeded as President General by Pamela Veuleman Trammell in 2015.

She is married to Roy W. Likins.
