= United Daughters of the Confederacy =

American hereditary association

- Official badge, depicting the "Stars and Bars", the first flag of the Confederacy

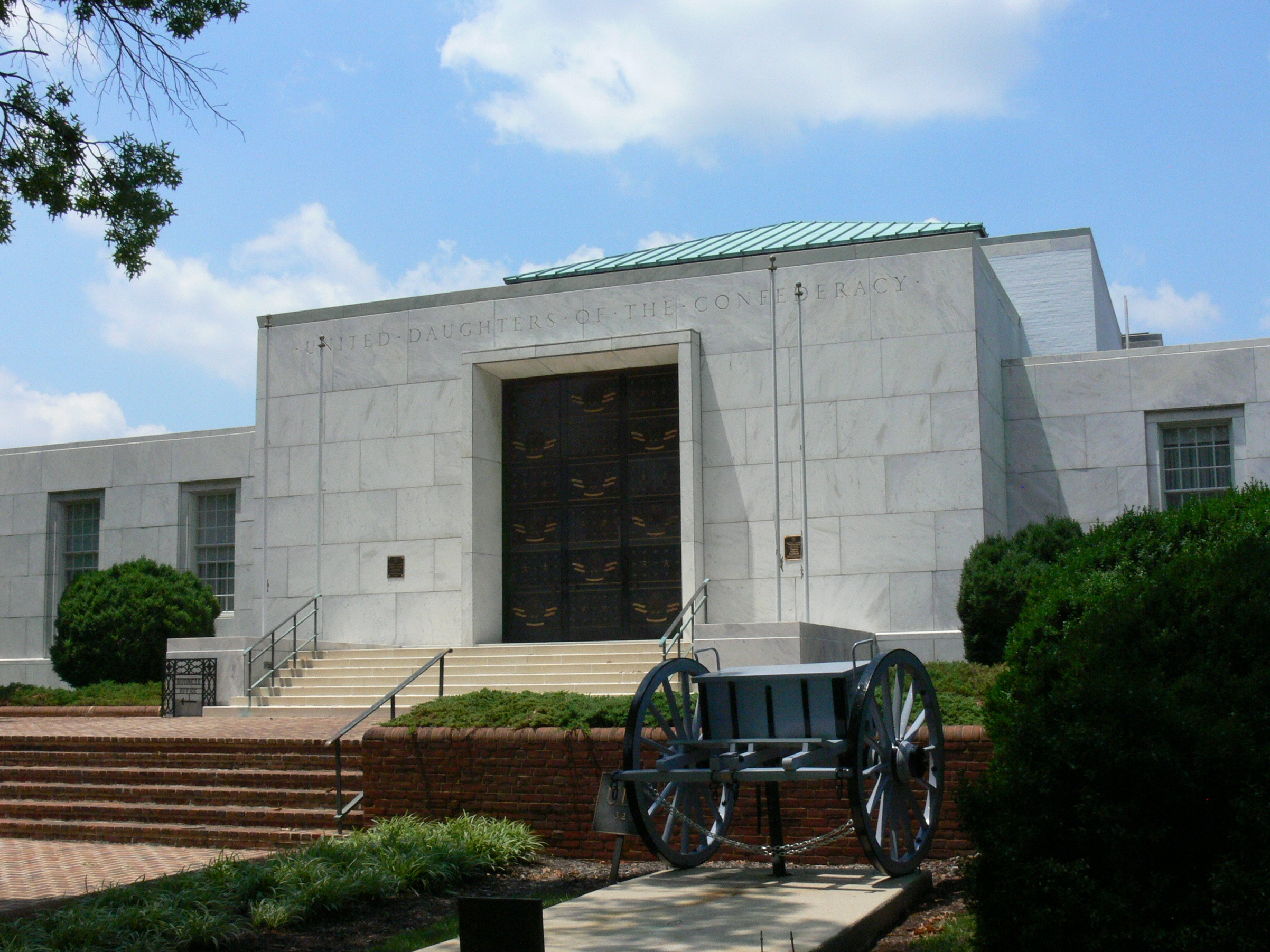
- Headquarters Building of the United Daughters of the Confederacy in Richmond, Virginia
- Abbreviation: UDC
- Established: September 10, 1894; 132 years ago
- Founders: Caroline Meriwether Goodlett; Anna Davenport Raines
- Founded at: Nashville, Tennessee
- Type: 501(c)(3), charitable organization, lineage society
- Tax ID no.: 54-0631483
- Headquarters: Memorial to the Women of the Confederacy; 328 North Arthur Ashe Boulevard; Richmond, Virginia, U.S.
- Coordinates: 37.5571518°N 77.4738453°W
- Members: 11,000 (2026)
- President General: Julie Noegel Hardaway
- Publication: UDC Magazine
- Subsidiaries: Children of the Confederacy
- Website: hqudc.org
- Formerly called: National Association of the Daughters of the Confederacy

The United Daughters of the Confederacy (UDC) is an American lineage-based neo-Confederate hereditary association for female descendants of Confederate Civil War soldiers engaging in the commemoration of these ancestors, the funding of monuments to them, and the promotion of the pseudohistorical Lost Cause ideology and corresponding white supremacy.

Established in Nashville, Tennessee, in 1894, the group venerated the Ku Klux Klan during the Jim Crow era, and in 1926, a local chapter funded the construction of a monument to the Klan. According to the Institute for Southern Studies, the UDC "elevated [the Klan] to a nearly mythical status. It dealt in and preserved Klan artifacts and symbology. It even served as a sort of public relations agency for the terrorist group." The organization restricted membership to whites at one time, but later lifted the requirement. As of 2011, there were 23 so-called "Real Daughters" (that is, actual children of Confederate veterans) still living, one of whom, Mattie Clyburn Rice, was black. There are no longer any living children of Civil War veterans. The last, Irene Triplett, died in 2020.

The group's headquarters are in the Memorial to the Women of the Confederacy building in Richmond, Virginia, the former capital city of the Confederate States. In May 2020, the building was damaged by fire during the George Floyd protests.

== Formation and purpose ==
The group was founded on September 10, 1894, by Caroline Meriwether Goodlett and Anna Davenport Raines as the National Association of the Daughters of the Confederacy. It is believed the name of the group came from an expression used by General John B. Gordon. On April 30, 1886, he was escorting Jefferson Davis, President of the Confederacy, to Georgia's capital when he introduced Davis's daughter, Winnie, to a waiting crowd as "the daughter of the Confederacy".

The first chapter was formed in Nashville. The name was soon changed to United Daughters of the Confederacy. Their stated intention was to "tell of the glorious fight against the greatest odds a nation ever faced, that their hallowed memory should never die." Their primary activity was to support the construction of Confederate memorials. The UDC has said that its members also support U.S. troops and honor veterans of all U.S. wars.

In 1896, the organization established the Children of the Confederacy to impart similar values to younger generations through a mythical depiction of the Civil War and Confederacy. According to historian Kristina DuRocher, "Like the KKK's children's groups, the UDC utilized the Children of the Confederacy to impart to the rising generations their own white-supremacist vision of the future." The UDC denies assertions that it promotes white supremacy.

The communications studies scholar W. Stuart Towns notes the UDC's role "in demanding textbooks for public schools that told the story of the war and the Confederacy from a definite southern point of view." He adds that their work is one of the "essential elements [of] perpetuating Confederate mythology."

The UDC was incorporated on July 18, 1919. Its headquarters is in the Memorial Building to the Women of the Confederacy, Richmond, Virginia, built in the 1950s.

== History ==
=== Early work ===
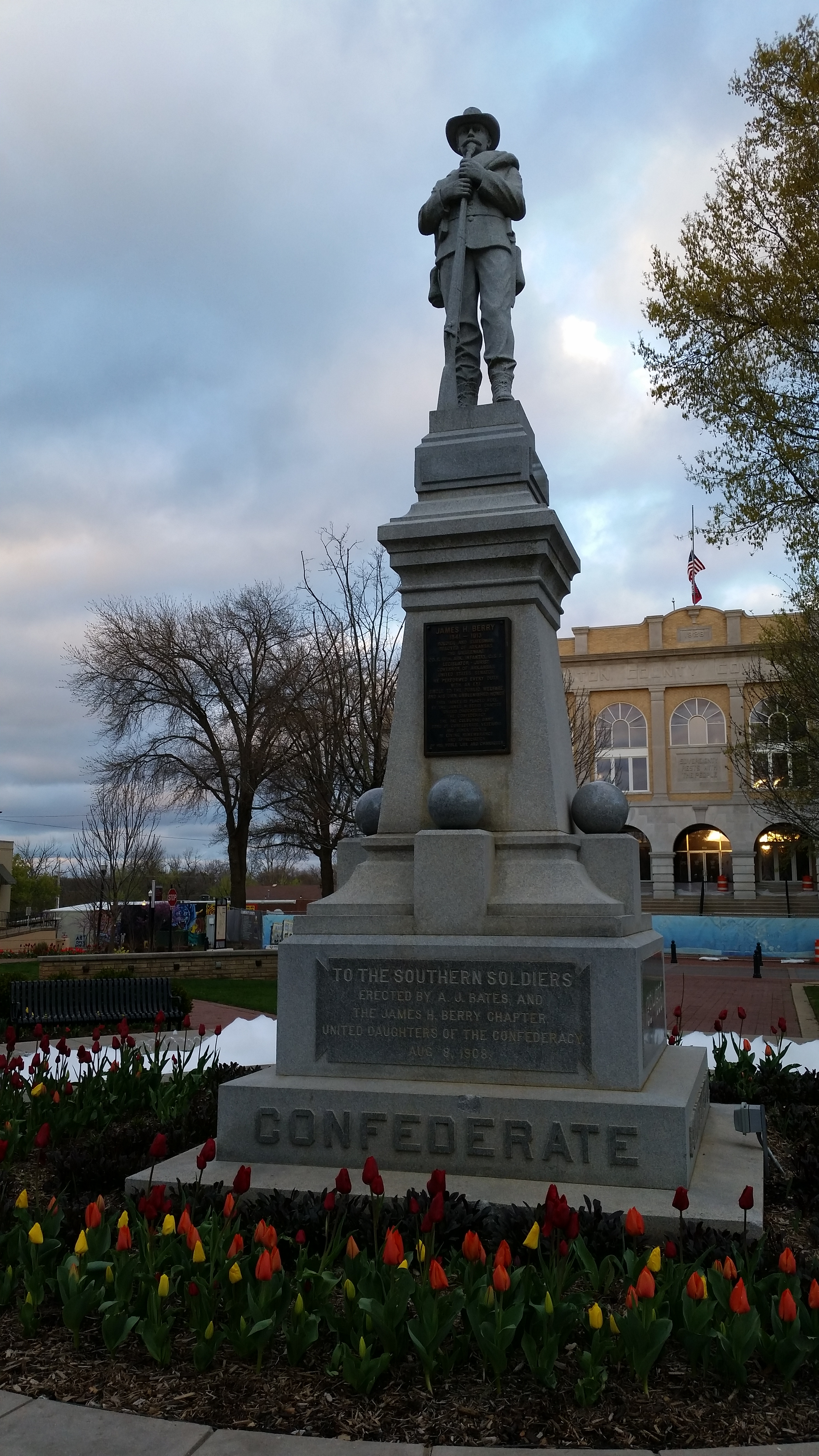
Monument dedicated by the UDC on August 8, 1908, Bentonville, Arkansas

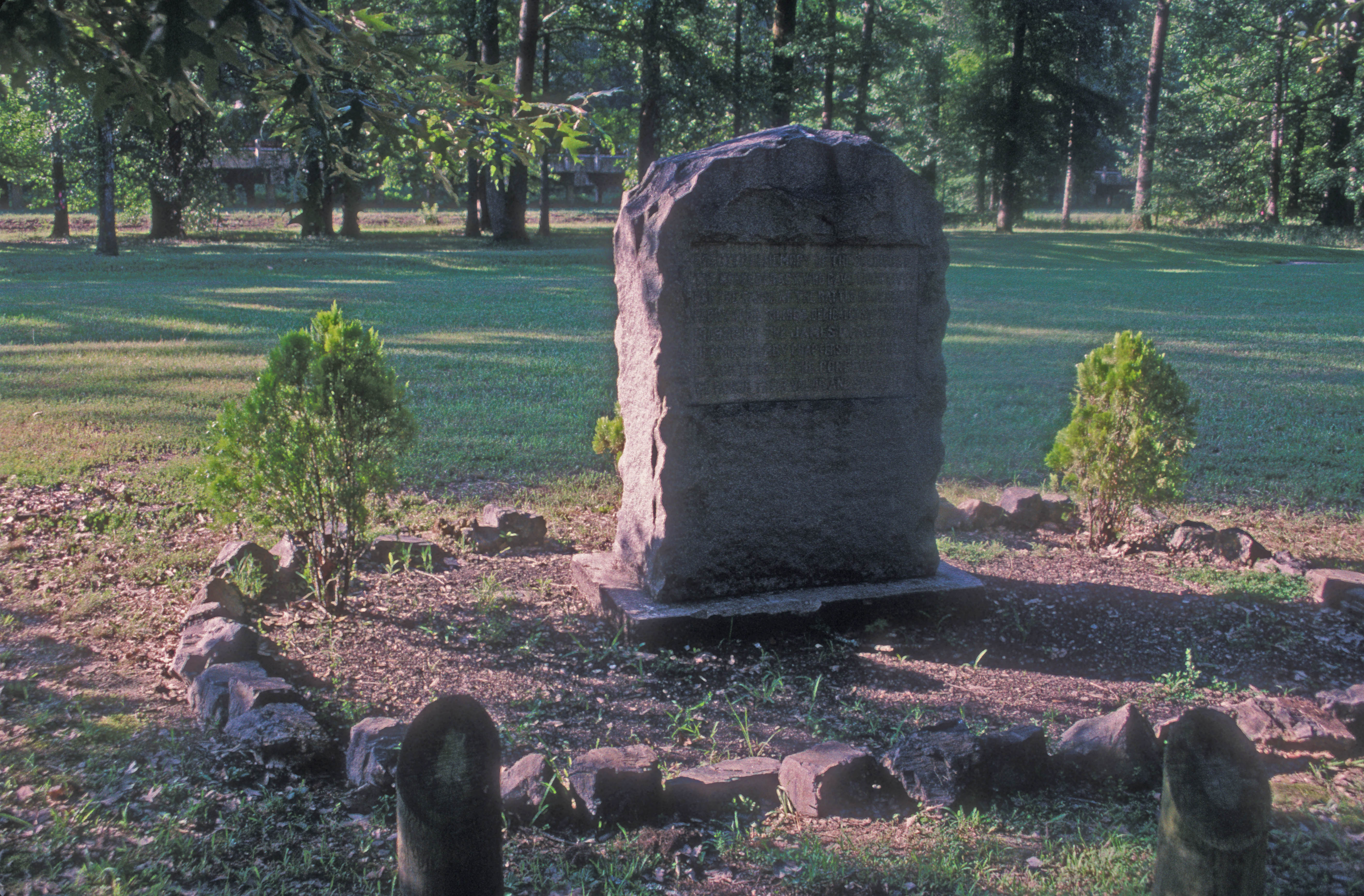
Battlefield memorial dedicated by the UDC on September 19, 1928

Across the Southern United States, associations were founded after the Civil War, chiefly by women, to organize burials of Confederate soldiers, establish and care for permanent cemeteries, organize commemorative ceremonies, and sponsor impressive monuments as a permanent way of remembering the Confederate cause and tradition.

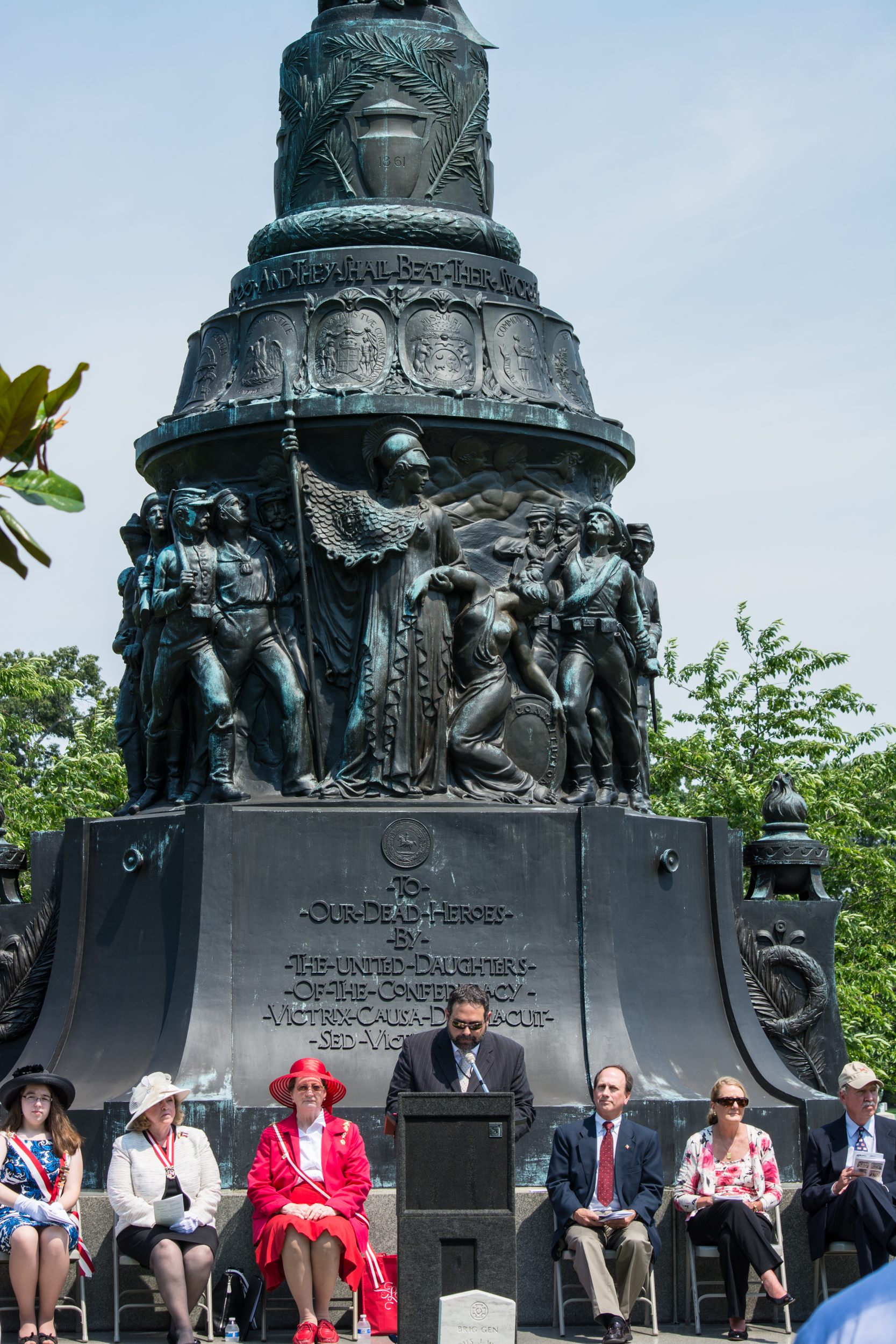
Confederate Memorial Day observance in front of the Monument to Confederate Dead, Arlington National Cemetery, on June 8, 2014

The organization was "strikingly successful at raising money to build monuments, lobbying legislatures and Congress for the reburial of Confederate dead, and working to shape the content of history textbooks." They also raised money to care for the widows and children of the Confederate dead. Most of these memorial associations gradually merged into the United Daughters of the Confederacy, which grew from 17,000 total members in 1900 to nearly 100,000 by World War I.

The UDC explicitly excluded black women from membership in 1902 (previously the requirement that the women be descended from Confederate soldiers effectively excluded black women). Furthermore, even white women from outside the upper classes were effectively excluded from membership by the requirements that a certain number of existing members had to approve a new member. Members of the UDC usually also had membership in numerous other clubs, ranging from innocuous clubs like gardening clubs to other white supremacist clubs. Some UDC speeches attracted crowds as big as 15,000 or 20,000 people. Speeches at UDC rallies explicitly endorsed white supremacy and criticized Reconstruction.

=== Monuments, memorials, and charity ===
The UDC was influential primarily in the early twentieth century across the South, where its primary role was to preserve, uphold and romanticize the memory of the Confederate veterans, especially those husbands, sons, fathers and brothers who died in the Civil War. Memory and memorials became the central focus of the organization.

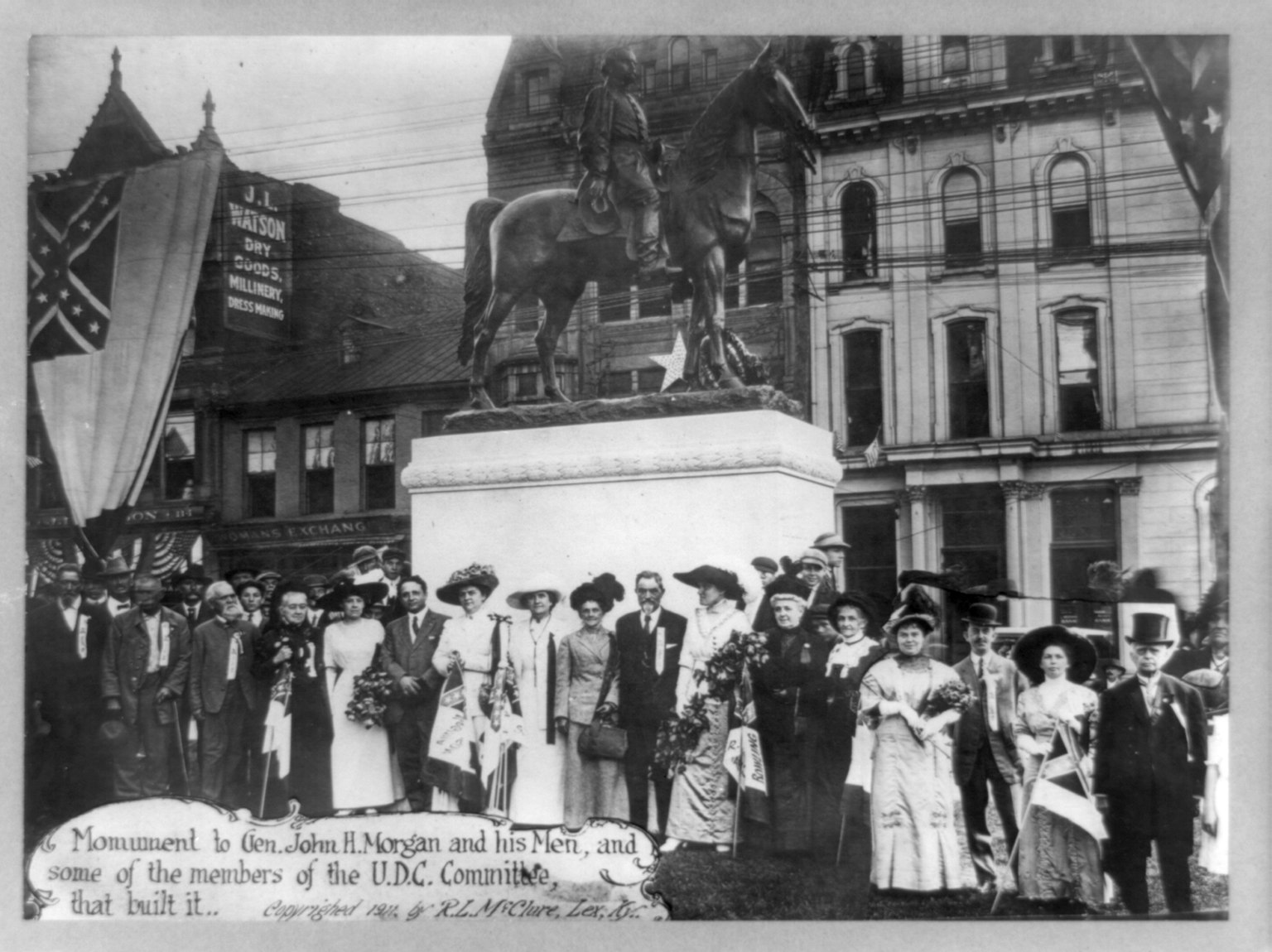
UDC members dedicating a monument to General John Hunt Morgan in 1911

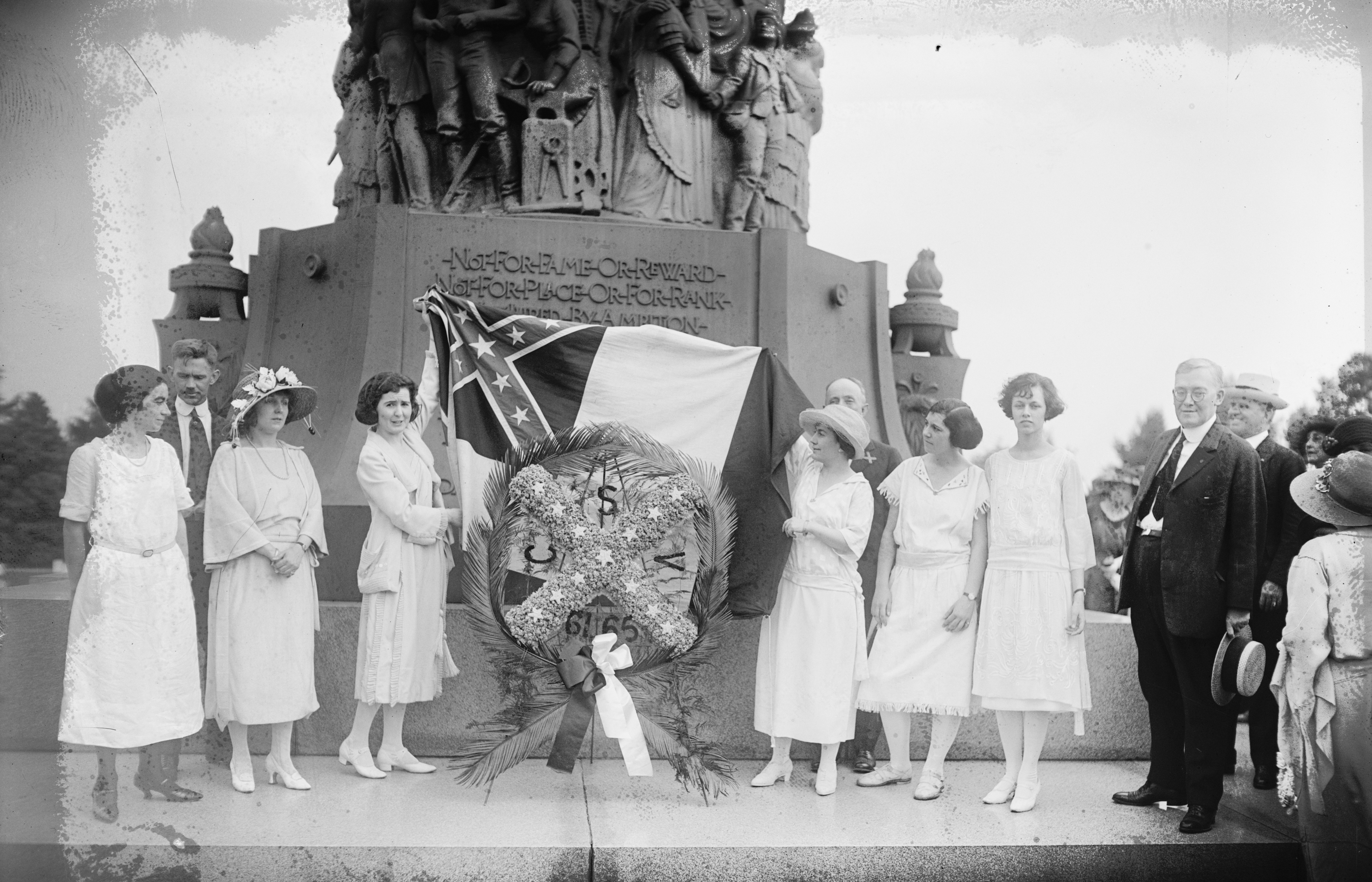
UDC members laying a wreath in Arlington National Cemetery, 1922

Historian Jacquelyn Dowd Hall notes that the UDC had a particular interest in the position of Southern (Confederate) women, with "a commitment to bolstering vanquished and disheartened veterans and keeping the memory of the dead alive. But it was also committed to immortalizing the heroism of Confederate women, whose valor, its leaders believed, had been every bit as important as men's." The UDC's methods were wide-ranging and ahead of their times:

UDC leaders were determined to assert women's cultural authority over virtually every representation of the region's past. This they did by lobbying for state archives and museums, national historic sites, and historic highways; compiling genealogies; interviewing former soldiers; writing history textbooks; and erecting monuments, which now moved triumphantly from cemeteries into town centers. More than half a century before women's history and public history emerged as fields of inquiry and action, the UDC, with other women's associations, strove to etch women's accomplishments into the historical record and to take history to the people, from the nursery and the fireside to the schoolhouse and the public square.

"The number of women's clubs devoted to filiopietism and history was staggering," says historian W. Fitzhugh Brundage, noting that women were much more likely to be involved in a variety of (historical) organizations than men, who devoted their energies to fraternal societies. Brundage notes that after women's suffrage came in 1920, the historical role of the women's organizations eroded.

After 1900, the UDC became an umbrella organization that coordinated local memorial groups. The UDC women specialized in sponsoring local memorials. After 1945, they were active in placing historical markers along Southern highways. The UDC has also been active in national causes during wartime. According to the organization, during World War I, it funded 70 hospital beds at the American Military Hospital on the Western front and contributed over US$82,000 for French and Belgian war orphans. The homefront campaign raised $24 million for war bonds and savings stamps. Members also donated $800,000 to the Red Cross. During World War II, they gave financial aid to student nurses.

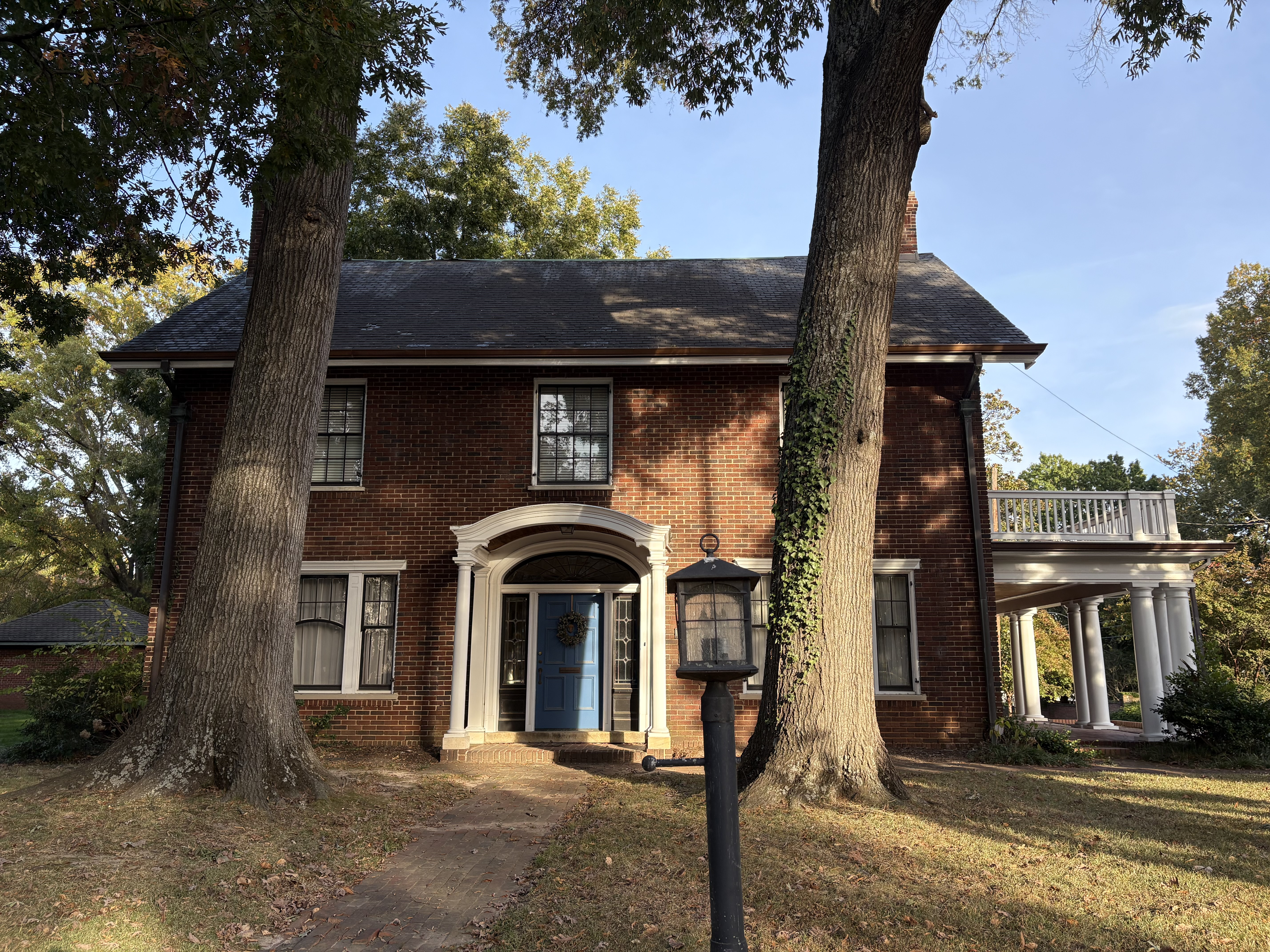
The Bailey-Bunn House in Raleigh, which serves as the headquarters of the North Carolina Division UDC.

In 1933 the Tennessee branch of UDC donated $50,000 for the construction of a Confederate memorial hall on the campus of the George Peabody College for Teachers which merged with Vanderbilt University in 1979. A university effort to remove the inscription "Confederate" from the building, resisted by the UDC, led to a 2005 Tennessee appeals court ruling that the inscription could be removed only if the UDC donation was returned at present value. In 2016 an anonymous source donated $1.2 million to the university specifically for that purpose, and the inscription was removed.

=== Memoirs ===
The UDC encouraged women to publish their experiences in the war, beginning with biographies of major southern figures, such as Varina Davis's of her husband Jefferson Davis. Later, women began adding more of their own experiences to the "public discourse about the war," in the form of memoirs, such as those published in the early 1900s by Sara Pryor, Virginia Clopton, Louise Wright and others. They also recommended structures for the memoirs. By the turn of the twentieth century, a dozen memoirs by southern women were published. These memoirs were part of the growing public memory about the antebellum years and vigorously defended the Confederacy and its founding principles (which included the enslavement of African Americans), thus supporting the white supremacist Lost Cause narrative.

=== Southern Cross of Honor ===
Southern Cross of Honor

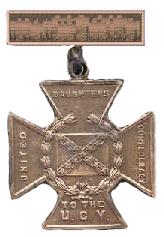
Obverse

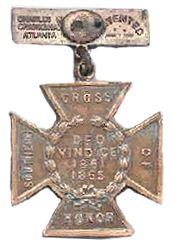
Reverse

The Southern Cross of Honor was a commemorative medal established by the United Daughters of the Confederacy for members of the United Confederate Veterans. It was proposed by Mary Ann Cobb Erwin at a meeting in 1898, with 78,761 crosses issued by 1913. The medal was never authorized to be worn on the United States Army, Navy, or Marine Corps uniform.

=== Scholarships ===
During the first decades of their existence, the UDC focused on caring for Confederate soldiers and their widows. When the numbers of Confederate veterans began to dwindle, they focused on their remaining objectives. Education of the descendants of those who served the Confederacy became one of the key interests of the organization. Some state divisions within the UDC built dormitories and sponsored scholarships, but there was no coordinated support for education by the national organization. The divisions were responsible for scholarships and building dormitories for women. At the 1907 General Convention, Caroline Meriwether Goodlett spoke of the shift in the UDC's focus. As monuments were erected, she "sat by ... thinking that the monument fever would abate." She believed that "the most thoughtful and best educated women" in the organization should have realized that the "grandest monument (they) could build in the South would be an educated motherhood."

The UDC combined education with support of the military during World War II by establishing a nurses' training fund. Each scholarship provided approximately $100 per year for a three-year nursing program. When a scholarship was offered, local Chapters were encouraged to contact local schools to locate students who needed assistance to fund their education.

In addition, the UDC sponsors essay and poetry compositions, in which the participants are not to use the phrase "Civil War," "War Between the States" being the preferred term.

=== Children of the Confederacy ===
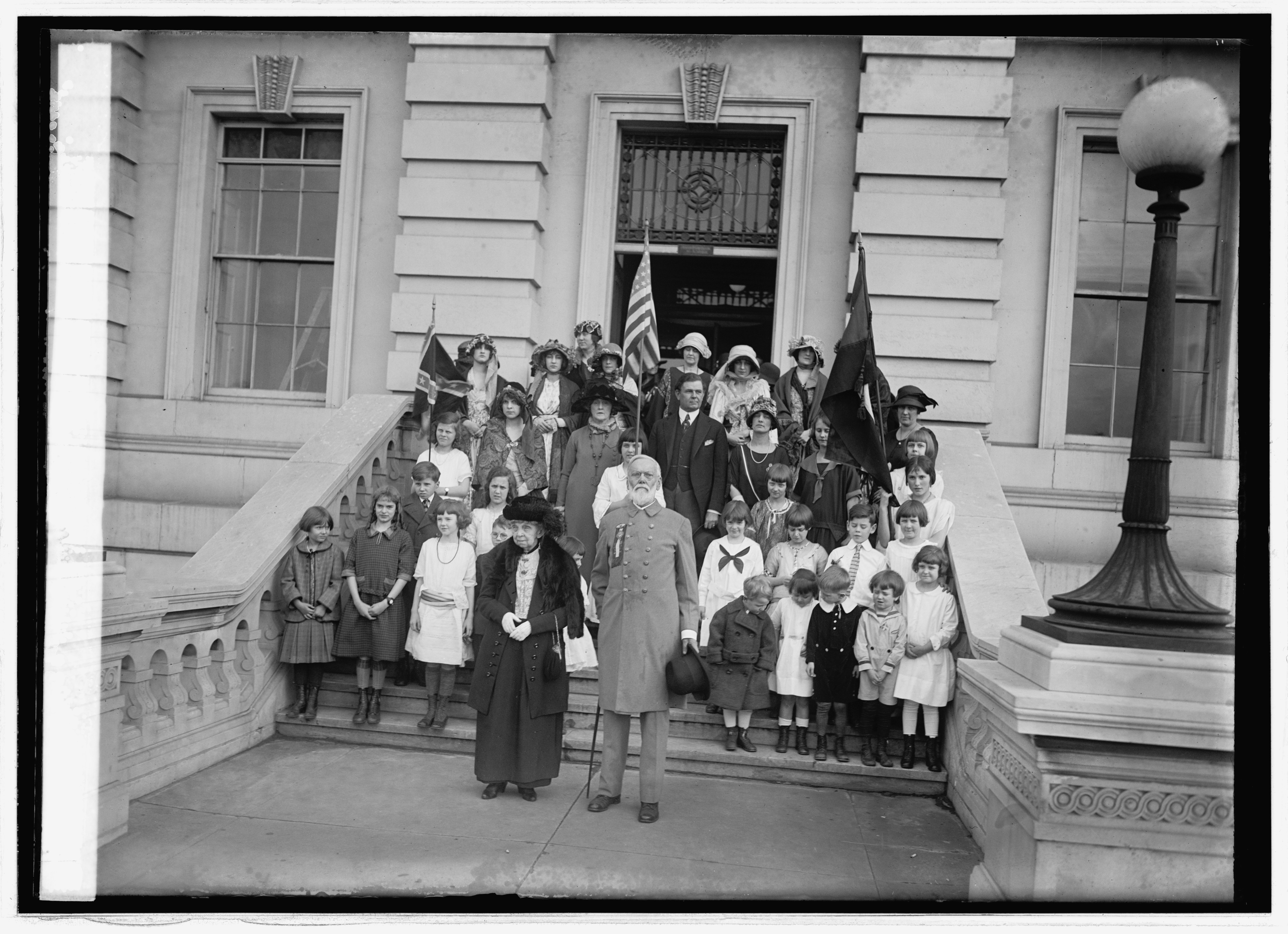
Children of the Confederacy in 1924

The Children of the Confederacy, also known as the CofC, is an auxiliary organization to the UDC. The official name is Children of the Confederacy of the United Daughters of the Confederacy. It comprises children from birth through the time of the Children of the Confederacy Annual General Convention following their 18th birthday. UDC chapters sponsor all Children of the Confederacy chapters. Children are taught Lyon Gardiner Tyler's "Catechism on the History of the Confederate States of America, 1861–1865," which says that Northerners did away with slavery because the climate was unsuitable, that they had no intention of ever paying the South for its slaves after abolition, that slaves in the South were faithful to their owners, who were caring and gentle people: cruel slave owners existed only in the North.

Before 2015, the "Creed" of the CofC read:

Because we desire to perpetuate, in love and honor, the heroic deeds of those who enlisted in the Confederate Services and upheld its flag through four years of war, we, the children of the South, have united in an Organization called the "Children of the Confederacy," in which our strength, enthusiasm and love of justice can exert its influence. We therefore pledge ourselves to preserve pure ideals, to honor the memory of our beloved Veterans, to study and teach the truths of history (one of the most important of which is that the War Between the States was not a rebellion, nor was its underlying cause to sustain slavery), and always to act in a manner that will reflect honor upon our noble and patriotic ancestors.

The phrase "nor was its underlying cause to sustain slavery" was deleted by the UDC General Convention of 2015.

=== George Floyd protests ===
During the early morning hours of May 31, 2020, the Memorial to the Women of the Confederacy headquarters building in Richmond was vandalized with graffiti and set ablaze during a chain of protests across the city in the wake of the murder of George Floyd. The Richmond Fire Department extinguished the fire using nine fire trucks. The President-General of the UDC reported that the building's windows had been broken and fire was set to the curtains hanging in the building's Caroline Meriwether Goodlett Library. The fire was largely contained to the library, but there was extensive smoke and water damage throughout the building and charring on the building's Georgia marble façade. Staff reported that all the books in the building's library had incurred some damage and that library shelving had been destroyed.

== "Lost Cause" and Neo-Confederate views ==
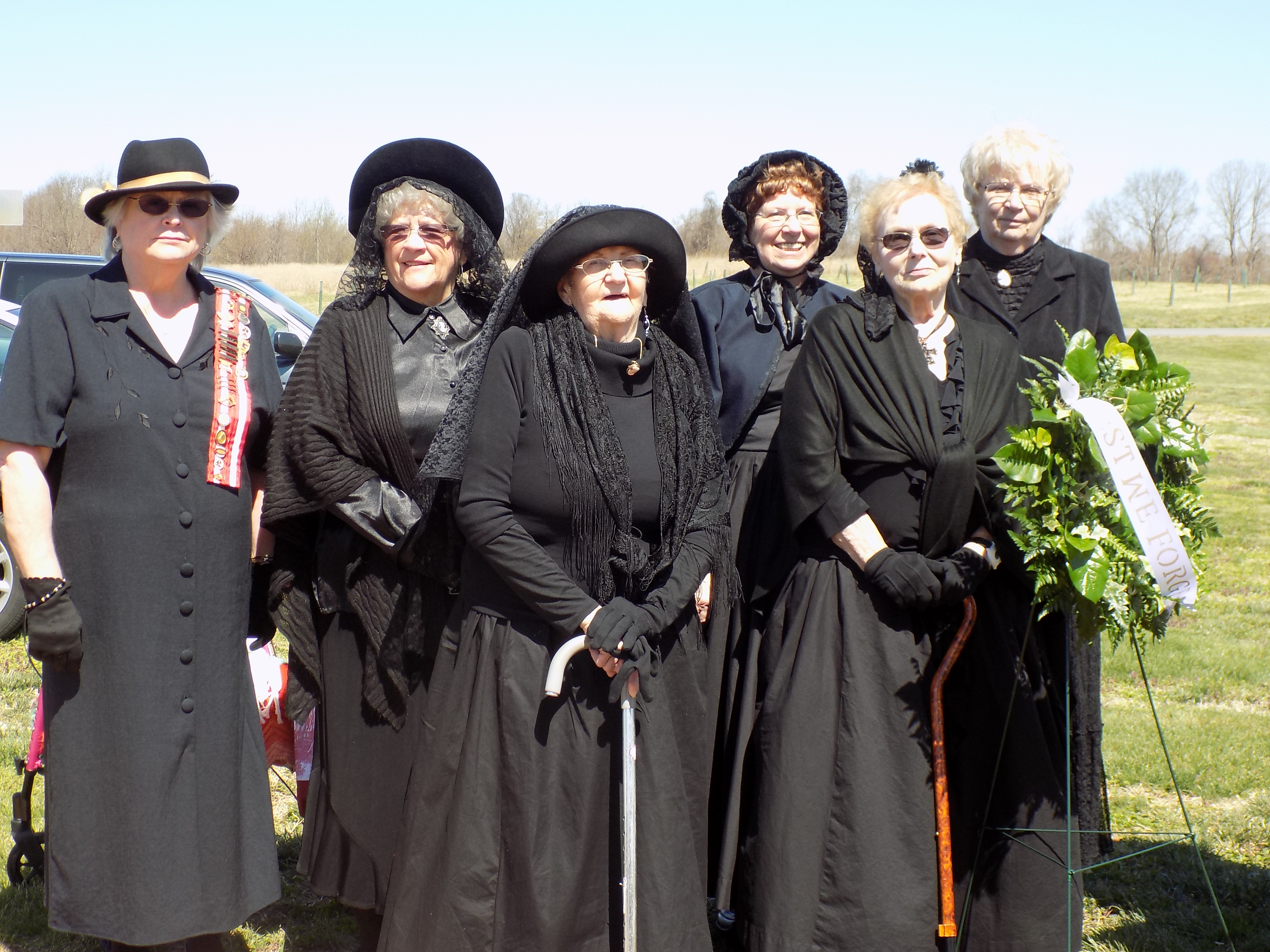
Members of the United Daughters of the Confederacy at Sailor's Creek Battlefield Historical State Park in 2015

Meredith College history professor and former Children of the Confederacy member Daniel L. Fountain states that organizations like the UDC have deeply "implanted the Lost Cause's falsified version of history" in the South. "Rallying behind powerful women such as Mildred Lewis Rutherford, the UDC relentlessly lobbied legislatures for public school textbooks that presented a pro-Confederate version of regional history and successfully blacklisted" other books. "By targeting the region's middle- to upper-class children, they ensured an army of future teachers and leaders would carry forward and defend their message for decades to come. Embedding their version of Confederate history into the sacred spaces of Southern society (the home, cemeteries, churches, city squares, street names, colleges and schools) made erasing it physically difficult and personally painful."

During the period 1880–1910, the UDC was one of many groups that celebrated Lost Cause mythology and presented "a romanticized view of the slavery era" in the United States. The UDC promoted white Southern solidarity, allowing white Southerners to refer to a mythical past in order to legitimize racial segregation and white supremacy. The UDC worked to "define southern identity around images from an Old South that portrayed slavery as benign and slaves as happy and a Reconstruction that portrayed blacks as savage and immoral." In 1919 their lost cause narrative was codified in Mildred Rutherford's Measuring Rod to Test Text Books and Reference Books, which the UDC endorsed and successfully used in debates over history textbooks across the South. More recently, historian James M. McPherson has said that the UDC promotes a white supremacist and neo-Confederate agenda:

I think I agree a hundred percent with Ed Sebesta, though, about the motives or the hidden agenda not too deeply hidden I think of such groups as the United Daughters of the Confederacy and the Sons of the Confederate Veterans. They are dedicated to celebrating the Confederacy and rather thinly veiled support for white supremacy. And I think that also is the again not very deeply hidden agenda of the Confederate flag issue in several Southern states.

The Southern Poverty Law Center (SPLC) considers the UDC as part of the Neo-Confederate movement, intrinsically white supremacist, that began in the early 1890s. The SPLC contends that the UDC promotes "a reactionary conservative ideology that has made inroads into the Republican Party from the political right, and overlaps with the views of white nationalists and other more radical extremist groups." In August 2018, its website still stated that "Slaves, for the most part, were faithful and devoted. Most slaves were usually ready and willing to serve their masters."

=== Ku Klux Klan ===
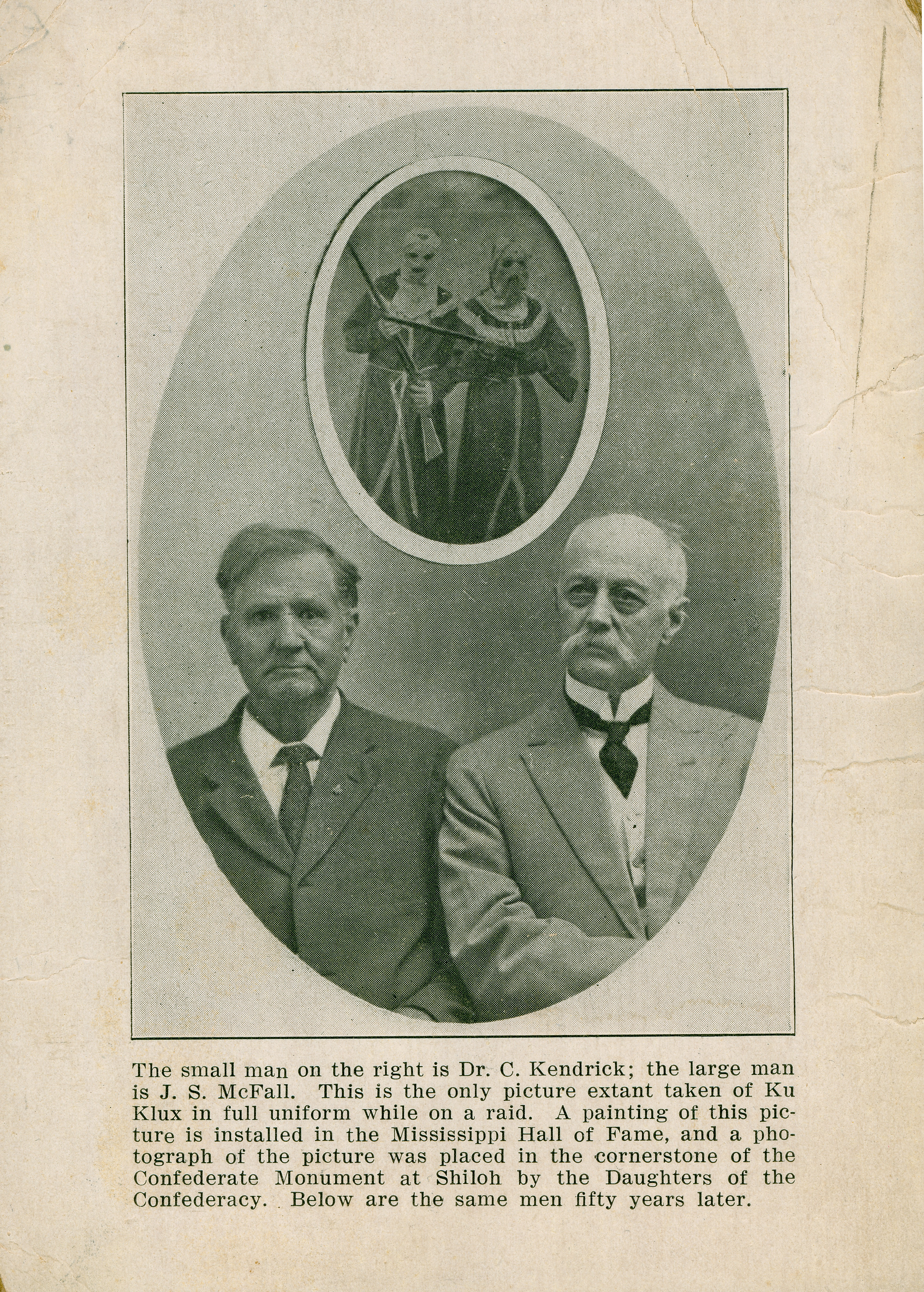
This picture of Carroll Kendrick and J.S. McFall in full Klansmen uniform was placed on the Confederate Monument at Shiloh National Military Park by the UDC

According to lawyer Greg Huffman, writing in Facing South, "perhaps nothing illuminates the UDC's true nature more than its relationship with the Ku Klux Klan. Many commentators have said the UDC simply supported the Klan. That is not true. The UDC during Jim Crow venerated the Klan and elevated it to a nearly mythical status. It dealt in and preserved Klan artifacts and symbology. It even served as a sort of public relations agency for the terrorist group."

In 1902, Mary Woodson Jarvis, the organizing president of the George B. Singletary UDC Chapter, published The Conditions that Led to the Ku Klux Klans, a booklet that glorified the Klan and condoned their use of terror against Black people.

At its 1913 annual national convention, the UDC unanimously endorsed The Ku Klux Klan, or The Invisible Empire, a book written by UDC historian Laura Martin Rose, then president of the UDC's Mississippi Division, which alleged that the Klan had rescued the South from carpetbagger-inspired racial violence. Published near the height of the UDC's Confederate statue-installation and textbook-vetting efforts, the book became a supplementary reader for Southern school children.

In 1914, UDC member Helen Plane received approval from the Georgia Division UDC to establish the Stone Mountain Memorial Association and persuaded Klan member Samuel Venable to deed one side of Stone Mountain for the creation of the Confederate memorial. Plane initially hired Gutzon Borglum, a Klan supporter, as the sculptor for project and wrote to him suggesting he add a tribute to Klan in the memorial:

I feel it is due to the Klan, which saved us from Negro dominations and carpetbag rule, that it be immortalized on Stone Mountain. Why not represent a small group of them in their nightly uniform approaching in the distance?

A local chapter of the UDC funded a now-vanished memorial to the Klan erected in 1926 near Concord, North Carolina. As late as 1936, the UDC's official publication featured an article which lauded the role of the Ku Klux Klan.

== Notable members ==
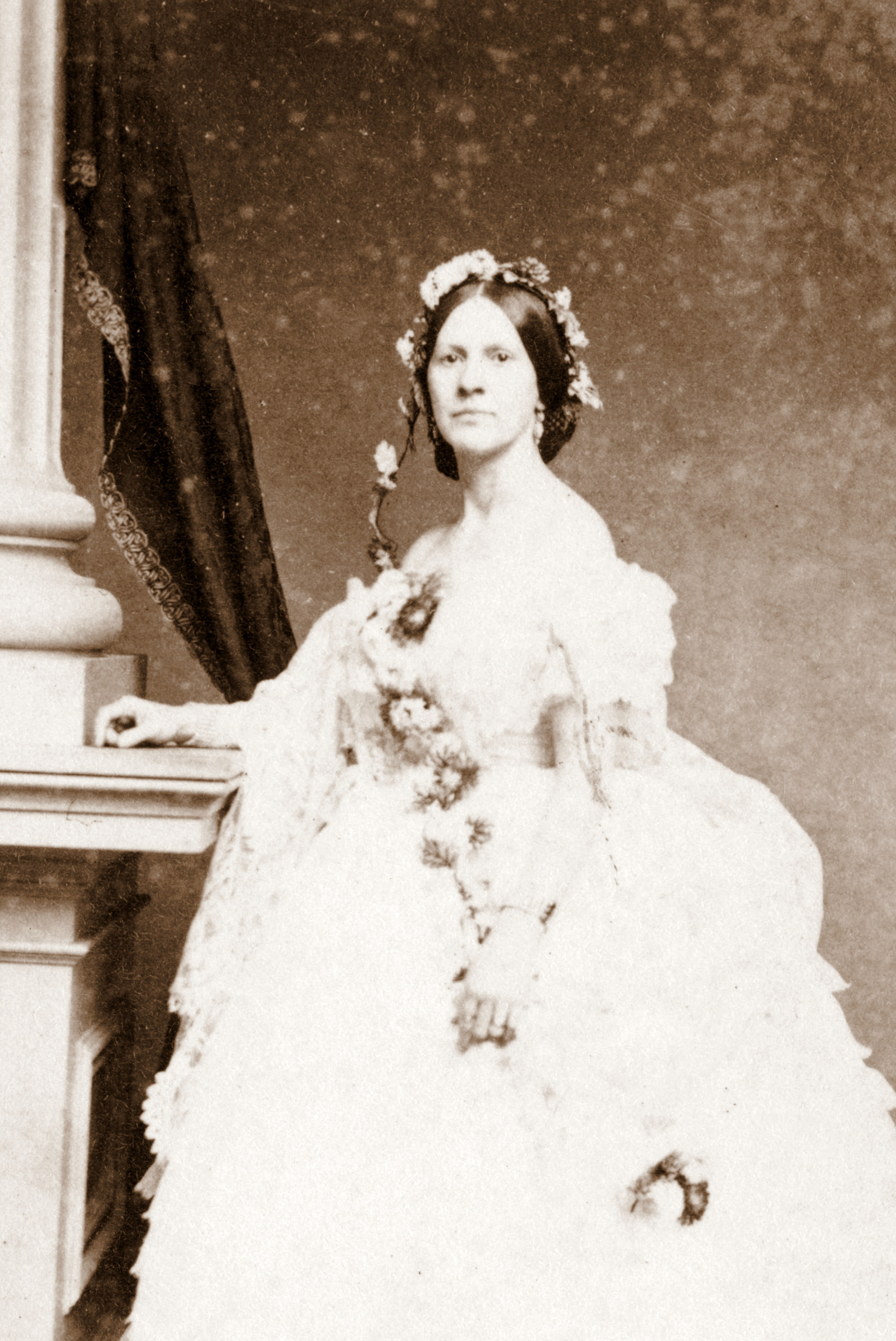
Virginia Clay-Clopton, a prominent socialite and suffragist, was a member of the UDC.

Since its founding, many notable women have been members of the United Daughters of the Confederacy including civic leaders, politicians, and society figures. Early members often came from prominent southern families and were noted socialites of their day, including Virginia Clay-Clopton, Jeannie Blackburn Moran, Leonora St. George Rogers Schuyler, Helen Plane, and Sarah Ewing Sims Carter Gaut. Throughout the Jim Crow era, many of these members were outspoken white supremacists and proponents of racial segregation in the United States, such as Mary Hilliard Hinton, Florence Sillers Ogden, Mildred Lewis Rutherford, and Laura Martin Rose. Some members, such as Edith D. Pope, went so far as to call for repatriation of African-American United States citizens to Africa. Members of the UDC were historically active in politics. Rebecca Latimer Felton was the first woman to sit in the United States Senate, Birdie Robertson Johnson was the first Democratic national committeewoman from Texas, Loula Roberts Platt was the first woman to run for a seat in the North Carolina Senate, Lillian Exum Clement was the first woman elected to a state legislature in the Southern United States, Vernettie O. Ivy sat in the Arizona House of Representatives, Gertrude Dills McKee sat in the North Carolina Senate, and Emma Guy Cromwell served as the Secretary of State and State Treasurer of Kentucky. Others had important public state roles, including Rosa Lee Tucker, the State Librarian of Mississippi, Alabama First Lady Laura Montgomery Henderson, Tennessee First Lady Elizabeth Childress Brown, and Fanny Yarborough Bickett, Margaret Gardner Hoey, Fay Webb-Gardner, and Mary Woodson Jarvis, who all served as first ladies of North Carolina. By the 21st-century, UDC membership opened up to African-American women, including Mattie Clyburn Rice and Georgia Benton.

=== UDC Presidents General ===
Women who have led the United Daughters of the Confederacy as President General include:

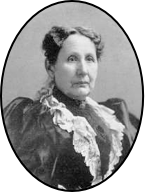
Caroline Meriwether Goodlett, founding President-General of the UDC.

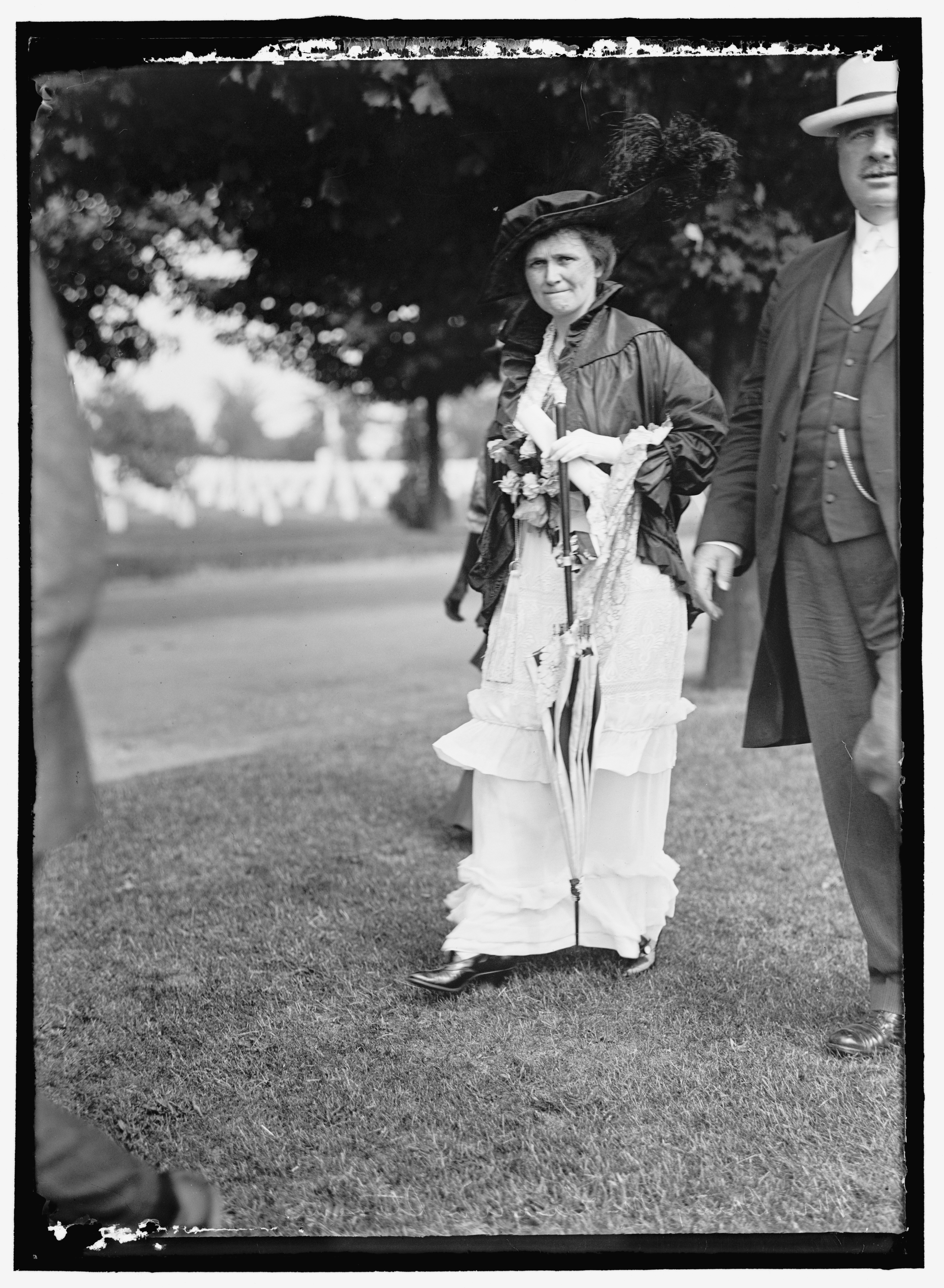
Daisy McLaurin Stevens, President-General of the UDC from 1913 to 1915

- Caroline Meriwether Goodlett, 1894–1895
- Elizabeth Childress Brown, 1895–1896
- Katie Cabell Currie Muse, 1897–1899
- Lizzie George Henderson, 1905–1907
- Cornelia Branch Stone, 1907–1909
- Virginia Faulkner McSherry, 1909–1911
- Rassie Hoskins White, 1911–1913
- Daisy McLaurin Stevens, 1913–1915
- Cola Barr Craig, 1917–1919
- May Faris McKinney, 1919–1921
- Leonora St. George Rogers Schuyler, 1921–1923
- Annie Guinn Massey, 1933–1935
- Jeanne Fox Weinmann, 1946–1948
- Estelle Avinger Haggard, 1949–1951
- Cecile Brawley Long, 1951–1953
- Mabel Sessions Dennis, 1953–1955
- Kathryn Slaughter Wittichen, 1957–1960
- Elizabeth Cody Bachman, 1960–1962
- Janice K. Langford, 2006–2008
- Jane Grier Durden, 2008–2010
- Martha Rogers Van Schaick, 2010–2012
- Jamie Likins, 2012–2014
- Pamela Veuleman Trammell, 2014–2016
- Patricia M. Bryson, 2016–2018
- Nelma Crutcher, 2018–2020
- Linda Edwards, 2020–2022
- Jinny Widowski, 2022–2024
- Julie Noegel Hardaway, 2024–present

== See also ==
- A Daughter of the Confederacy
- List of monuments erected by the United Daughters of the Confederacy
- List of women's organizations
- Ladies' Memorial Association
- Southern Dames of America
- Daughters of Union Veterans of the Civil War, 1861–1865
- National Society Daughters of the Union 1861-1865

== Sources ==
- Blight, David (2001). Race and Reunion: The Civil War in American Memory. Cambridge, Massachusetts: Harvard University Press.
- Cox, Karen L. (2003). Dixie's daughters: the United Daughters of the Confederacy and the preservation of Confederate culture. Gainesville: University Press of Florida. ISBN 978-0813064130.
- DuRocher, Kristina (2011). Raising racists: the socialization of white children in the Jim Crow South. University Press of Kentucky. ISBN 978-0813130019.
- Faust, Drew (2008). This Republic of Suffering: Death and the American Civil War. New York: Alfred A. Knopf. ISBN 978-0375404047.
- Gardner, Sarah (2006). Blood And Irony: Southern White Women's Narratives of the Civil War, 1861–1937. Chapel Hill: University of North Carolina Press. ISBN 978-0807857670.
- Gulley, H. E. (1993). "Women and the Lost Cause: Preserving A Confederate Identity in the American Deep South". Journal of Historical Geography. 19 (2): 125–141. doi:10.1006/jhge.1993.1009.
- Janney, Caroline E. (2012). Burying the dead but not the past: Ladies' Memorial Associations and the lost cause. University of North Carolina Press. ISBN 978-0807831762.
- Simpson, John A. (2003). Edith D. Pope and Her Nashville Friends: Guardians of the Lost Cause in the Confederate Veteran. Knoxville: University of Tennessee Press. ISBN 978-1572332119. OCLC 428118511.
- Towns, W. Stuart (2012). Enduring Legacy: Rhetoric and Ritual of the Lost Cause. University of Alabama Press. ISBN 978-0817317522.
- Mills, Cynthia; Simpson, Pamela Hemenway, eds. (2003). Monuments to the Lost Cause: Women, Art, and the Landscapes of Southern Memory. Univ. of Tennessee Press. ISBN 978-1572332720.
- Minutes of the Fifty-first Annual Convention of the United Daughters of the Confederacy, Incorporated, Held at Nashville, Tennessee, November 21–24, 1944.
