= Ginnie Sebastian Storage =

American clubwoman

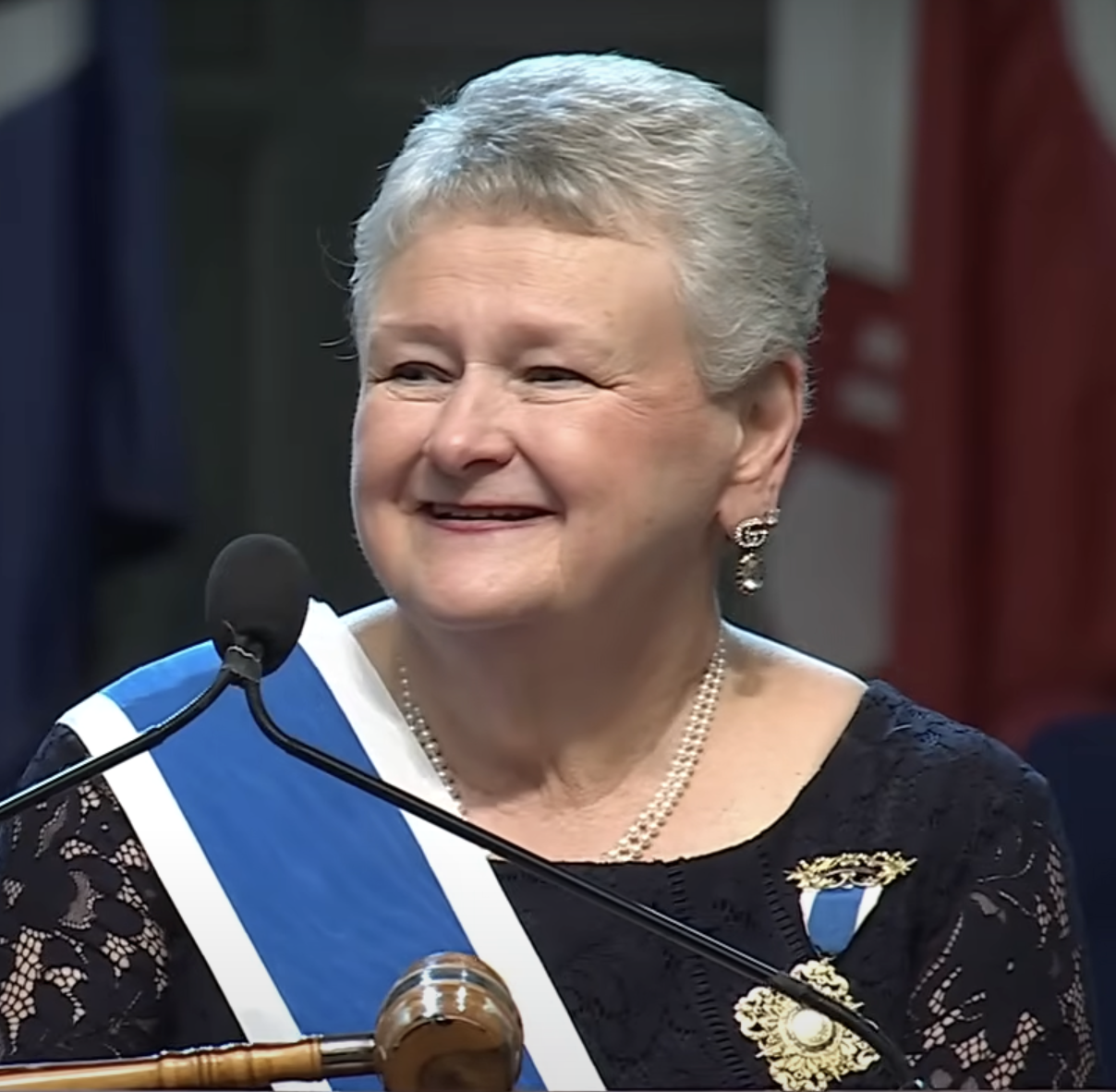
- Storage in 2025

47th President General of the Daughters of the American Revolution
- Incumbent
- Assumed office June 29, 2025
- Preceded by: Pamela Rouse Wright

Personal details
- Born: Virginia Sebastian Fredericksburg, Virginia, U.S.
- Spouse: Mark Storage
- Children: 1
- Education: University of Virginia (BA); Averett University (MBA)

Virginia Sebastian "Ginnie" Storage is an American clubwoman and medical practice administrator. Since June 29, 2025, she has served as the 47th President General of the Daughters of the American Revolution. In her capacity as president general, she serves on the board of the National First Ladies Day Commission and as an advisor to the Women's Suffrage National Monument Foundation. In 2025, she hosted Queen Sofía of Spain during a Spanish-American history symposium at DAR Constitution Hall. Storage was named in Forbes 50 Over 50 list in 2026.

== Early life, family, and education ==
Storage is the daughter of William McGowan Sebastian and Mary Virginia Satterwhite. She was born and raised in Fredericksburg, Virginia and attended Stafford Senior High School. Storage earned the Gold Award as a member of the Girl Scouts of the USA and was a member of the Children of the American Revolution. She is a descendant of Lilly McIlhaney Bowen, an Irish-American colonist who supported the American Revolution. She is also a descendant of revolutionary soldiers Benjamin Sebastian, Robert Bowen, Robert Satterwhite, James Marders, Henry Carter, Esli Hunt, John Hallam, William Hallam, Alexander Oliver, and David Leach.

She earned a bachelor of arts degree from the University of Virginia, where she was a member of Sigma Delta Tau, in 1986 and later earned a masters degree in business administration from Averett University.

== Career ==
Storage served as vice president of administration for NSWC Federal Credit Union in Dahlgren, Virginia, coordinating the branch administration, human resources office, and training functions for over one hundred of the credit union's employees. She works as a practice administrator for an Hematology Oncology Associates of Fredericksburg.

Storage holds professional designations as a Professional in Human Resources (HRCI), SHRM-CP (SHRM), a Certified Compensation Professional, a Global Remuneration Professional, and Certified Credit Union Executive (CUNA).

Storage is a member of the leadership advisory council for the Hereditary Society Community of the United States of America.

=== Daughters of the American Revolution ===
Storage is a member of the Washington-Lewis Chapter of the National Society Daughters of the American Revolution. She was installed as the Virginia State Regent of the Daughters of the American Revolution on June 30, 2013, during the national society's 122nd Continental Congress. She presided at the 2013 Board of Management Meeting on July 27, 2013 at the Kirkley Hotel and Conference Center in Lynchburg, Virginia. As state regent, she launched a state project aiding the non-profit George Washington Foundation for the construction of their replica of the 1740 George Washington House at Ferry Farm. Her state administration raised over $350,000 to underwrite a room on the first floor of the 1740 Washington Home's replica on Ferry Farm and committed over $50,000 to preserving Virginia records.

She served as the Organizing Secretary General for the national society under the administration of President General Denise Doring VanBuren. She later served as the organizations First Vice President General during the administration of President General Pamela Rouse Wright. In March 2025, she spoke at the ribbon cutting for the reopening of the Marian Anderson Museum in Philadelphia.

On June 29, 2025, Storage succeeded Wright as the 47th President General of the Daughters of the American Revolution during the 134th Continental Congress at DAR Constitution Hall in Washington, D.C. In her role as president general, Storage serves on the board of directors of the National First Ladies Day Commission and as an advisor to the Women's Suffrage National Monument Foundation. In September 2025, Storage hosted Queen Sofía of Spain at DAR Constitution Hall for the Spain and the Birth of American Democracy history symposium, an event held in partnership with the Queen Sofía Spanish Institute as part of the celebrations for the United States Semiquincentennial. In October 2025, Storage presented Anne, Princess Royal with a commemorative bowl at Westminster Abbey during the 100th anniversary celebration of the Walter Hines Page Chapter NSDAR in the United Kingdom.

In February 2026, Storage served as a Grand Marshall of the George Washington Birthday Parade in Old Town Alexandria, alongside Sons of the American Revolution President General Michael Elston.

In August 2026, Storage was named in Forbes 50 Over 50 List for her work in the DAR to identify more women of color and Indigenous women who contributed toward American independence.

== Personal life ==
Storage lives in Fredericksburg, Virginia and is a member of the Fredericksburg Ladies Memorial Association. She married Mark Storage in 1991. They have one daughter, Mackie, who served as National President of the Children of the American Revolution from 2019 to 2020.
