= Pamela Rouse Wright =

American philanthropist, businesswoman, and jewelry designer

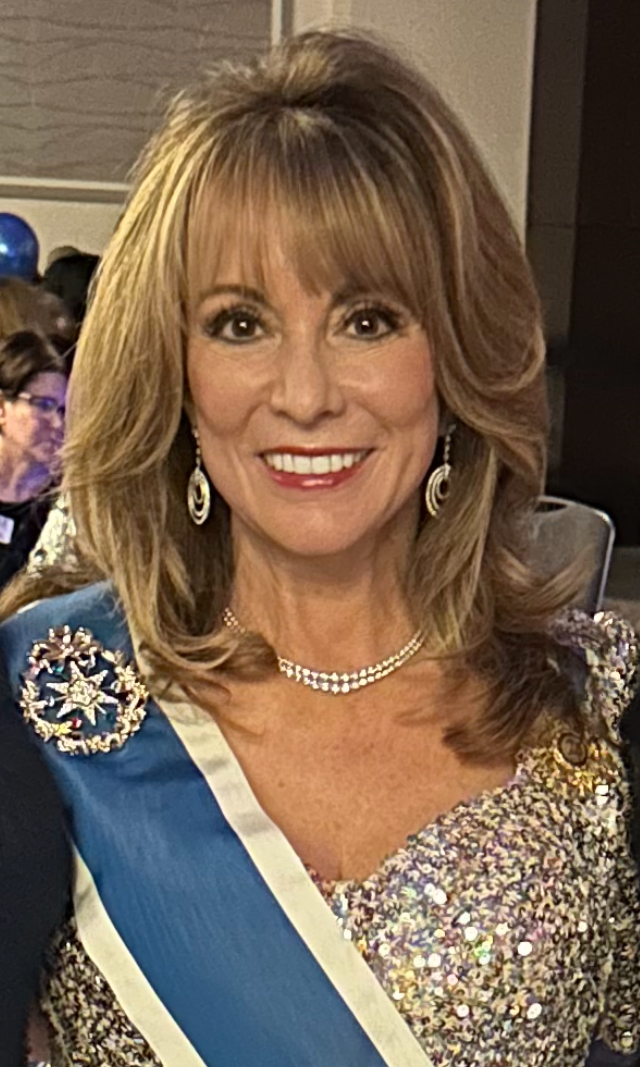
- Wright in 2024

46th President General of the National Society Daughters of the American Revolution
- In office July 3, 2022 – June 29, 2025
- Preceded by: Denise Doring VanBuren
- Succeeded by: Ginnie Sebastian Storage

Personal details
- Born: Pamela Hilda Edwards Rouse Georgia, U.S.
- Spouse: John Griffin Wright
- Children: 2
- Education: Ouachita Baptist University; University of Arkansas; Gemological Institute of America
- Occupation: Philanthropist, businesswoman, jewelry designer, clubwoman
- Awards: Yellow Rose of Texas Award; Woman of Valor Award
- Website: pamelawright.com

Pamela Hilda Edwards Rouse Wright is an American philanthropist, businesswoman, and jewelry designer. She served as the President General of the National Society Daughters of the American Revolution from 2022 to 2025. She was the second Texan to serve as the national society's president general. In 2022, Wright was presented with the Yellow Rose of Texas Award by Governor Greg Abbott for charitable contributions and volunteerism in Texas. In 2025, she became the first president general to be appointed to the board of trustees of the National First Ladies Day Commission.

Under Wright's administration, the Daughters of the American Revolution worked to become a more inclusive and diverse organization. In January 2023, Wright created the Lena Ferguson Scholarship for students at the University of the District of Columbia, named in honor of Lena Santos Ferguson, a black woman who was denied membership to local chapters of the organization in 1980 due to racist policies and was later accepted as a member-at-large at the national level in 1983. Wright commissioned a commemorative plaque honoring Ferguson to be placed in the memorial garden at DAR Constitution Hall.

== Early life, family, and education ==
Wright was born and raised in Georgia, the daughter of Charles Benjamin Rouse Sr. and Wauneithe (née Mitchell) Rouse. Charles Benjamin Rouse Sr., a Korean War veteran, was a recipient of the Good Conduct Medal, the China Service Medal, the Navy Occupation Service Medal, the United Nations Service Medal Korea, and the Korean Service Medal with six stars.

Wright's great-grandfather, Carlo Bucci, immigrated to the United States in the 1870s from the Campobasso Province in Italy and anglicized his name to Charles Walter Smith. She is a descendant of Pvt. Reuben Roberts Sr., who served under the command of George Washington during the American Revolutionary War. She also descends from thirteen other American colonists who served or provided aid for American independence from the Kingdom of Great Britain.

She graduated magna cum laude from Ouachita Baptist University and attended graduate school at the University of Arkansas. She received certifications through the Gemological Institute of America and the International Society of Appraisers.

== Career ==
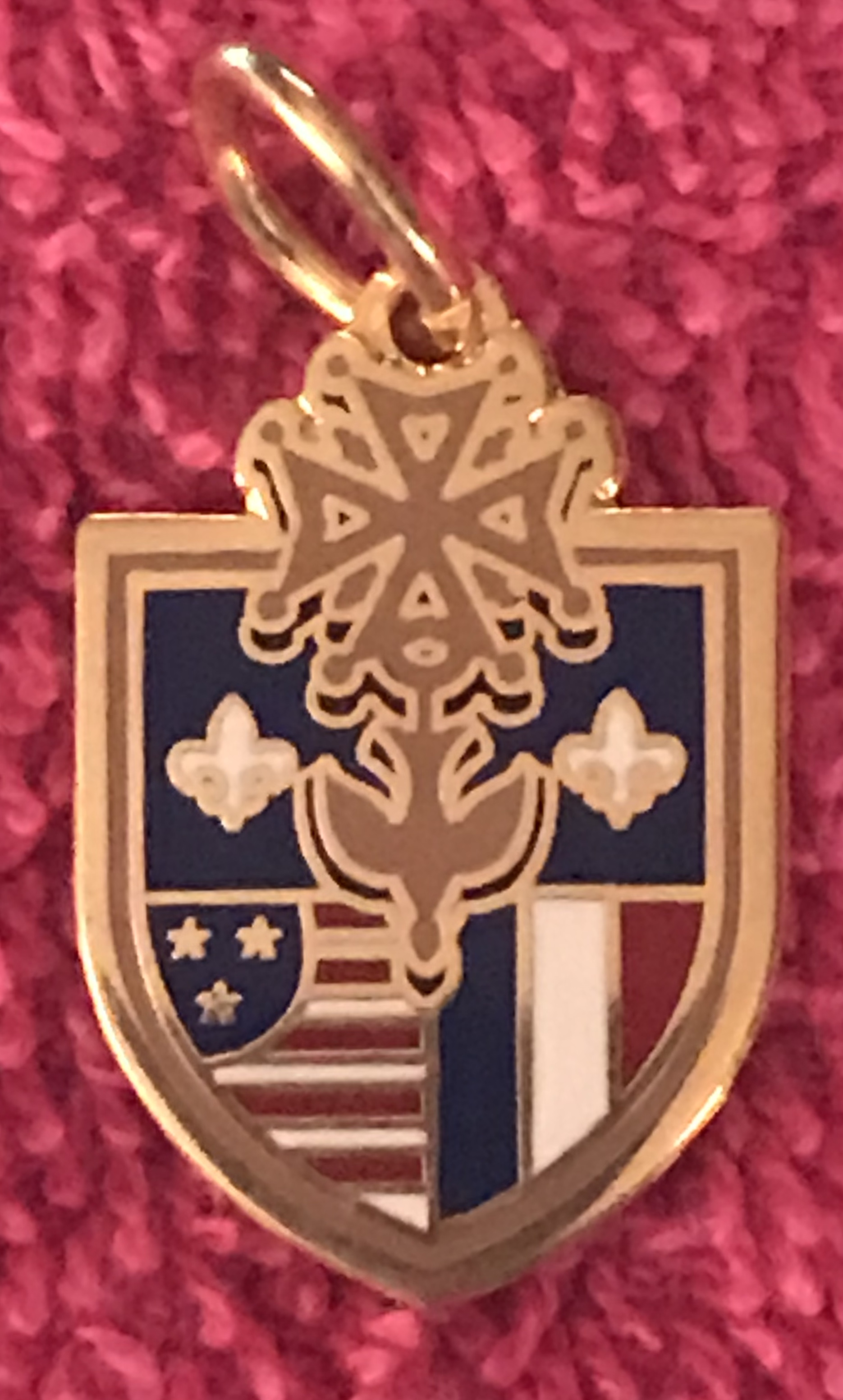
Pin for the National Huguenot Society, designed by Wright.

Wright is the co-founder and owner of Wright Pawn & Jewelry, a jewelry and luxury goods company based in Houston. As a jewelry designer, her clients have included First ladies of Texas and of First ladies of the United States, as well as other wives of prominent American politicians. She designed the Texas Front Porch pin, which was selected by then-Texas First Lady Anita Thigpen Perry as a sale item to benefit the Texas Governor's Mansion Restoration Fund.

She serves on the advisory board of the National Society Descendants of American Farmers and on the leadership advisory council of the Hereditary Society Community of the United States of America and is a member of the Southern Dames of America and the United States Daughters of 1812. In June 2025, Wright joined the board of trustees of the National First Ladies Day Commission. Wright is also an ambassador for the Women's Suffrage National Monument Foundation.

=== Daughters of the American Revolution ===
Wright was the third generation of her family to join the Daughters of the American Revolution, as her mother and grandmother were also members. She joined the national society as a member of the Lady Washington Chapter in Houston, Texas. She participated in her first Texas State Conference of the Daughters of the American Revolution in 1988.

In 1999, she became the Centennial Regent of the Lady Washington Chapter. In 2012, she was appointed as the State Regent of Texas. Under her leadership as State Regent, the organization's membership in Texas increased to more than 18,000. She was elected to national office in 2016 as the Chaplain General. In 2018, Wright was elected to serve as First Vice President General and, on July 3, 2022, she was elected and installed as the 46th President General of the National Society of the Daughters of the American Revolution. She is the second woman from Texas to serve as President General, after Lynn Forney Young. Wright transitioned the Daughters of the American Revolution Insignia Store from an outside commercial vendor to an in-house operation.

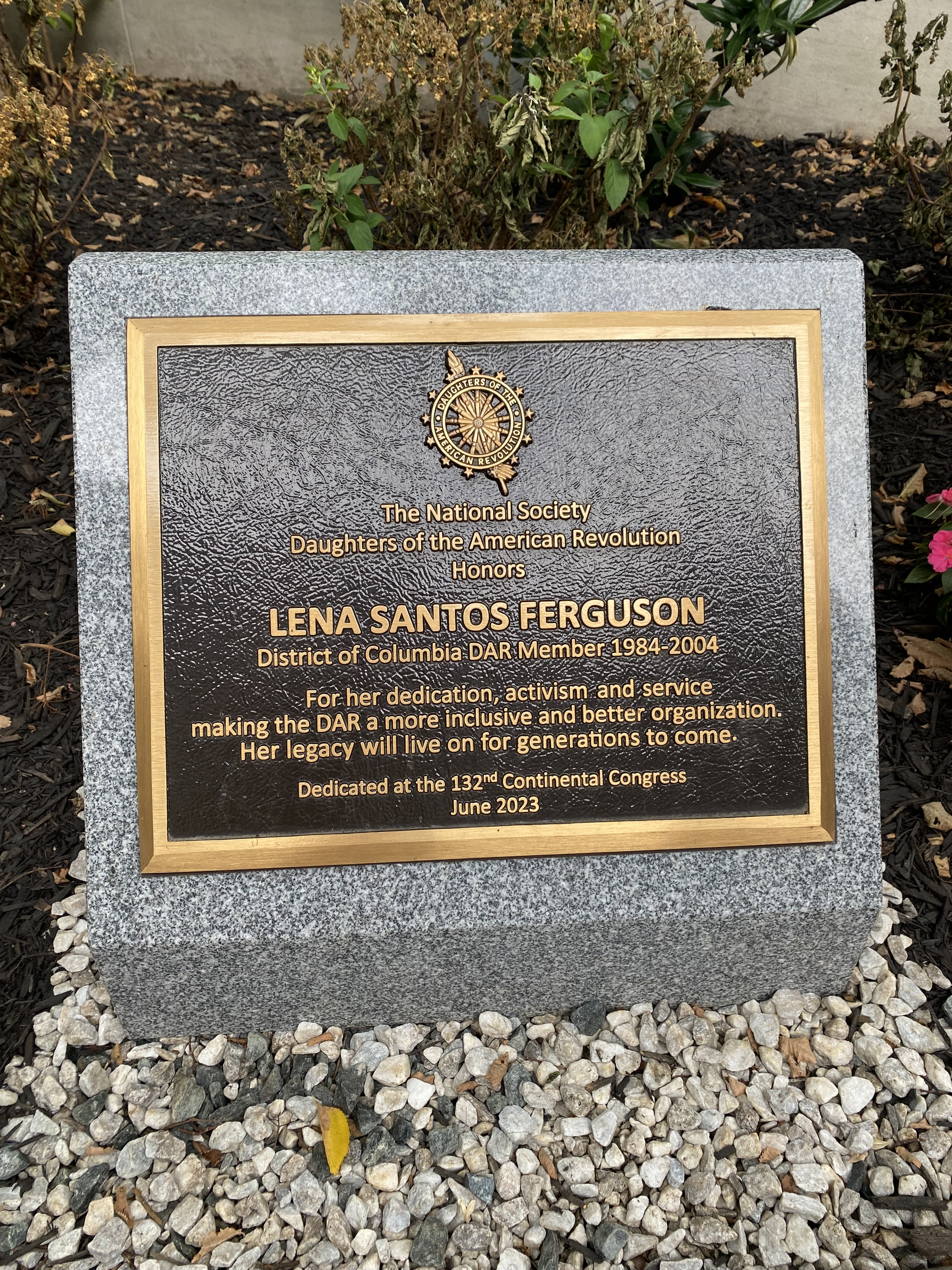
Commemorative plaque installed by Wright honoring Ferguson at the D.A.R. headquarters in Washington, D.C.

In January 2023, Wright personally invited Serena Ferguson, the daughter of Lena Lorraine Santos Ferguson, who was denied membership to the organization in the 1980s because of their racist policies at the time, to join the Daughters of the American Revolution and created the Lena Ferguson Scholarship to benefit students at the University of the District of Columbia. Wright commissioned a memorial plaque, in honor of Lena Ferguson, that was placed in the memorial garden at DAR Constitution Hall.

In March 2023, Wright unveiled a new plaque at The Old Burial Ground in Sturbridge, Massachusetts that honors sixty-four Revolutionary War patriots who are buried there.

In April 2023, in her capacity as President General, Wright presented state awards to students who partook in a historical essay contest hosted by the Colonel David Hall Chapter of the Daughters of the American Revolution in Delaware.

In November 2023, Wright had a papal audience with Pope Francis in the Vatican.

Under Wright's administration, the Daughters of the American Revolution passed an amendment to the society's bylaws at the 2023 DAR Continental Congress that states the organization cannot discriminate on the basis of gender, religion, or sexual orientation. At the congress, a DAR delegate inquired whether chapters could vote against admitting a new member if the applicant had amended their birth certificates to indicate they were female. Wright responded to Mease's inquiry by stating "if a person’s certified birth certificate states ‘female,’ they are eligible for membership, and your chapter cannot change that.. if their birth certificate says they are a female, and you vote against them based on their protected class, it's discrimination." In a newsletter released after the congress, Wright wrote, "some have asked if this means a transgender woman can join DAR or if this means that DAR chapters have previously welcomed transgender women. The answer to both questions is, yes."

Her official portrait, painted by Mexican-American artist Gladys Roldan-de-Moras, was unveiled at Memorial Continental Hall in June 2025.

Wright was succeeded as president general by Ginnie Sebastian Storage on June 29, 2025 and became an honorary president general of the national society. She serves as the national chair of the DAR's America 250! committee in the Storage administration.

== Awards ==
Wright is the recipient of the Houston Treasure Award and ABC13's Woman of Distinction Award. She was also listed as a STEM Role Model, listed as one of the 50 Most Influential Woman in Houston, listed as one of the 25 Most Beautiful Houstonians, and inducted into the Citizens for Animal Protection's Hall of Fame. She was commissioned a Yellow Rose of Texas Award in 2022 by the Governor Greg Abbott for charitable contributions and volunteerism. On June 28, 2025, Wright was presented with the Woman of Valor Award by Phyllis J. Wilson, president of the Military Women's Memorial.

== Personal life ==
Wright is a Southern Baptist and attends Second Baptist Church Houston.

She is married to John Griffin "Jack" Wright, whom she met in college, and has two children and eight grandchildren, who are all members of the Children of the American Revolution.
