= Hudson River Valley National Heritage Area =

US National Heritage Area in New York

Coordinates: 41.088°N 73.968°W

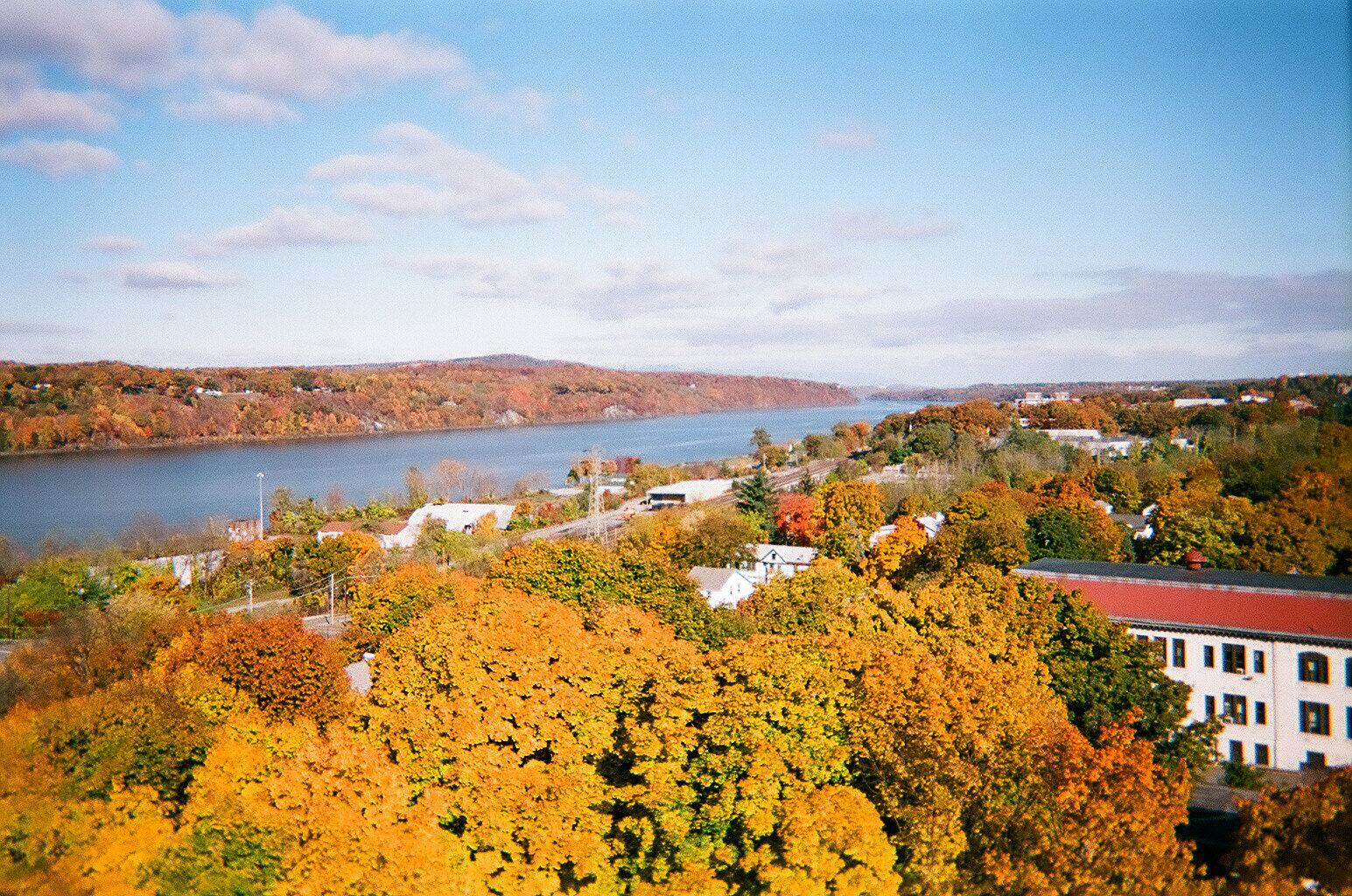
The Hudson Valley from the Poughkeepsie Bridge

The Hudson River Valley National Heritage Area is a congressionally designated National Heritage Area which includes the Hudson Valley in the U.S. state of New York from Saratoga Springs south almost to New York City. It is one of 62 National Heritage Areas in the United States. It provides a unified promotional framework for a select number of the area's tourist attractions, with concentration on the area's architecture, history, landscape, artistic heritage and environment, as well as interpretation of the area's historical significance in the American Revolution, the Industrial Revolution and its continuing history through the present day. As of mid-2024, legislative efforts are underway to expand the boundaries of the Maurice D. Hinchey Hudson River Valley National Heritage Area to include Saratoga and Washington Counties. This proposal aims to recognize and preserve the historical and cultural significance of these additional regions within the heritage area.

== History ==
The Hudson River Valley National Heritage Area was designated in 1996. The designated area includes Albany, Rensselaer, Columbia, Greene, Ulster, Dutchess, Orange, Putnam, Westchester and Rockland counties, as well as the village of Waterford in Saratoga County.

== Designated sites ==
Designated sites are organized by 3 themes: Freedom and Dignity, Nature and Culture and Corridor of Commerce. Major sites within the National Heritage Area include West Point, Saratoga National Historical Park, Olana State Historic Site, Thomas Cole National Historic Site, Clermont State Historic Site, Eleanor Roosevelt National Historic Site, Home of Franklin D. Roosevelt National Historic Site, the Walkway Over the Hudson, Lyndhurst, Jay Estate and Vanderbilt Mansion National Historic Site.

These sites are estimated to generate $20 million in economic impact as a result of annual events hosted to attract tourism.

== Publications ==
The list of sites is accompanied by a website and guidebook. The Hudson River Valley Institute at Marist College is the academic arm of the Hudson River Valley National Heritage Area.

== Awards ==
In November 2024, the Hudson River Valley Greenway awarded a total of $306,625 in matching grants to ten Hudson Valley communities. These funds support projects aimed at creating new trails, enhancing public access, and revitalizing communities within the heritage area.
