= Yellow Rose of Texas Award =

Honorary commission conferred by the Governor of Texas

Yellow Rose of Texas, awarded to Jennifer Kinsey, wife of Major General Johann R. Kinsey, August 15, 2019

The Commission of the Yellow Rose of Texas, commonly referred to as the Yellow Rose of Texas, is an honorary commission conferred by the Governor of Texas to Texas women for exceptional community service.

== History ==
The award was conceived and inaugurated by Governor Allan Shivers before the end of his second term in 1957. The Yellow Rose of Texas is given to women, by the Texas Governor, for exceptional community service.

== Eligibility ==
The Yellow Rose of Texas is an honorary commission recognizing outstanding Texas women for significant contributions to their communities and to Texas through community service in the preservation of history, the accomplishments of present, and the building of future.

== Recipients ==
Governor Price Daniel
Governor John Connally
Governor Preston Smith

1972: Dolly B. Patterson (née Hawkins; 1892–1979) of El Paso for her work with suffrage and with the Democratic Party since women were first allowed to vote. She had been an alternate delegate to the 1924 Democratic National Convention. She raised money, by rallying El Paso citizens to donate their Gold Bond stamps, to purchase a bus for a school for handicapped children.
1972: Louise Slover (née Sarah Louise Head; 1938) of Henderson
1972: Pamela Percival (née Pamela Slover; 1959) of Henderson

Governor Dolph Briscoe

1977: Izean Davidson (née Izean Franklin; 1913–1999) of the Fort Worth Independent School District
1977: Christia Adair (née Christia V. Daniels; 1892–1989) for courageous activism in civil rights through her involvement in the Houston Chapter of the NAACP. Her certificate was also signed by Mark White, then Secretary of State. Adair, in 1984, was inducted into the Texas Women's Hall of Fame.
1978: Helen Large (née Helen Joan Burrier; 1943–2013) of Kingwood

Governor William P. Clements

1980: Karen Ruth Thompson (née Karen Ruth Dannelly; (1944-2020) of Austin. Authored 7 historical books, 56 Texas State Historical Markers, saved untold cemeteries, started Save Texas Cemeteries, served as President General of DRT 2011-2013
1980: Norma Schreiner for her work on the Y O Ranch and its 1980 Centennial and as first woman elected as a director to South Texas Longhorn Association
1982: Dianna Truelove Heiner (née Dianna Lynn Truelove; 1947–1998), Fort Worth
1982: Victoria (Vicky) Carbary (née Victoria Teresa Blumberger; 1917–2012)

Governor Mark White

1989: Anita Winters (née Anita Pearl Bergman; 1911–2005) of Johnson City
1989: Doris Miller, Executive Vice President, Burleson Chamber of Commerce
1989: Virginia Lee Williams Wingate (1935–2015) for her work on the restoration of and obtaining the Texas Historical Marker for the one room Wooster School House, in recognition as a charter member and Board leadership of the Baytown Historical Preservation Association, and also for her work as Curator of the Wooster School House, Baytown
1990: Nita Rene Smith (1954–2019) of Austin, Texas Department of Insurance

Governor Ann W. Richards

1991: Mary Fillingim (née Mary Catherine Caldwell; 1924–2010) of San Antonio spent much of her life advocating for those with mental disabilities
1991: Ola Mae Lisle (was presented on October 14, 1991). Ola Mae owned and operated a cotton gin in Rule, Tx
1992: Almeda M. Laughlin
1992: Carla McFarland of Alpine for restoration of Historic Holland Hotel and numerous volunteer activities including many tourism related board activities
1993: Cora Thompson (née Bishop; 1898-2000) of Austin for her work as the head cook at the state capital for over 60 years as well as her work as a member of the local NAACP chapter during the Civil Rights movement. Awarded February 19, 1993.
1993: Rosalie E. Winnik.
1994: Beatrice Irene Fakan of Corpus Christi in recognition of her contributions to the arts, including music and poetry. Her works include compositions such as “Corpus Christi Waltz” and “Padre Island Blues.”

Governor George W. Bush

1996: Angie Klein (née Angie Kendall) Texas Department of Public Safety
1998: Amelia ("Mellie") Durán (née Jimenez; born 1936), San Antonio
1999: Alice Neel, San Antonio Texas (born 1919)
2000: Callie Abrams, 147th Medlog Fort Sam Houston, Texas

Governor James Richard "Rick" Perry

2001: Cynthia Calvert (née Cynthia Frances Burrus; born 1956), Humble, Texas
2001: Barbara Jordan (née Barbara Ann Scott; 1939–2015) of Kingwood, founder of the Kingwood Area Republican Women's Club
2001: Cloma Jackson (née Cloma Luker; 1917–2013) of San Antonio, of Floresville donated land in 2005 to Wilson County which became part of Jackson Nature Park, near Stockdale. Jackson was nominated by State Representative Edmund Perry Kuempel (1942–2010) of Seguin and Judge Marvin Claud Quinney (born 1945)
2001: Susan D. Gueck-Gunn for years of volunteer service to military members and families through numerous agencies.
2002: Betty Vogel - Manchaca Born Randolph Air Force Base in Kirby, Recognized for humbly giving over 50+ years of service in Texas as an outstanding, selfless, and dedicated volunteer in her community of Manchaca alongside her husband, Clarence, Honored Texas Admiral-Texas Navy. A mentor and Friend to many. Her enduring and unwavering support and work with Law Enforcement, Manchaca Emergency Services (Fire, ESD EMS), and Military. Her lifetime of outstanding leadership and advancement of youth programs and unyielding dedication to serving others for symbolizing the enduring legacy of a supportive community.
2002: Gloria Anita Johnson (née Scaldini; 1925–2010), of Killeen, 30-year volunteer at Metroplex Hospital, now AdventHealth Central Texas
2003: Myrna C Banzon (née Malic), Killeen
2003: Cheryl A Zeffer (née Huffman), Fort Worth
2003: Patti Kay Bray (née), Killeen
2004: Molly Ward, survivor of the New London School Explosion. Awarded due to her scholarship and creation of the New London School Explosion museum, as well as her time serving as Mayor.
2006: Kim Ann Thompson Estes, Burleson ISD Learning Technologist, Awarded for community service rendered for Naval Air Station Joint Reserve Base Fort Worth.
2006: Eloise Lundgren, Chief of Community Relations, Fort Hood
2006: Tina Lanier for her volunteerism and support of military families through Fort Hood’s Family Readiness Groups for two deployments during Operation Iraqi Freedom, and other post organizations
2007: Mandy M Pierce for her volunteerism and support of military families through Fort Hood’s Family Readiness Groups for two deployments during Operation Iraqi Freedom, and other post organizations
2007: Leticia Gonzalez for her volunteerism and support of 36th CAB during Operation Iraqi Freedom
2007: Kimberly DeLoughery, for her volunteerism and support of military families through the 215th Briage Support Battalion “Blacksmiths,” 3rd Briadge Combat Team, 1st Cavalry Division, Fort Hood, Texas Family Readiness Groups for two deployments during Operation Iraqi Freedom.
2008: Michelle Cox for her volunteerism at Fort Hood's Soldier and Family Readiness Center
2008: Aggie Velasquez for her volunteerism and support of military families at NAS/JRB Fort Worth Family Readiness Center
2009: Penny Westerfeld (née Penny Lou Sargent; born 1947), for her service, from 1979 2011, which included executive roles, to the Lone Star College System, Humble, Kingwood
2009: Holly Hirshberg (née Holly Linda Bognar; born 1971), founder of The Dinner Garden, a 501(c)(3) charity offering gardening expertise and supplies aimed at ending hunger, San Antonio
2009: Stephanie Young (née Saiki), for her dedication and support to the military children and families of Fort Hood's 41st Fires Brigade ("Railgunners")
2009: Dr. Brenda H. Edmonds for her outstanding civilian service from 1992, which included executive positions to the US military Army Community with selfless service to military members and their families, San Antonio.
2009: June Pape, Hurst
2009: Yvonne Imergoot (Herbel) for her dedication and support to the military children and families of Fort Hood from 2004-2009, and for her outstanding civilian service from 2007-2013; which included executive positions in the Department of the Army with selfless service to military members and their families.
2010: Karolin Guadarrama for her outstanding and selfless volunteerism with the Family Readiness Group at Fort Bliss
2010: Mindy Walski for her volunteerism with the Family Readiness Group at Fort Bliss
2010: Major General Mary Saunders
2010: Janet Hickl (née Janet Faye Wood; born 1955) for 10 years of service as administrative assistant for the Sons of the Republic of Texas, Bay City
2012: Melissa Westergard for her dedication and support with the 2-38 Cav, Bravo Troop Family Readiness Group at Fort Hood
2012: Candace Robinson, wife of the Command Chief of the 59th Medical Wing, San Antonio
2012: Sara Boykin, Family Readiness Group Leader, for her support and dedication to military families, Fort Bliss, TX; Jessica Juarez (formally Jessica Vargas), Family Readiness Group Leader, the honor received from the 303rd Military Intelligence Battalion, Fort Hood, for her support and dedication to military families.
2012: Sharon Millians (née Sharon Elaine Sappington; born 1948), of Fort Worth, for her support of numerous volunteer and community service projects including the Tarrant County Women's Center, the Child Study Center and the Chiapas Project
2012: Lillian Estelle Mingus (née Lillian Estelle Christopher; 1912–2013) received the award after her 100th birthday
2012: Ann Williamson Hibbs - A Dallas County Master Gardener and Flower Show Judge, recognized for her consistent efforts in beautifying Texas, educating our students, and her strong and varied personal volunteerism. Her enduring and unwavering support of Lee Elementary School, the Texas Daffodil Society, and the Military exemplify the tenets of the Yellow Rose of Texas
2013: Judy A. Rouse, Galveston, Texas, issued July 2013.
2013: Judge Ada E. Brown for her service as a Commissioner with the Texas Department of Public Safety and Texas Commission on Law Enforcement
2013: Susan Hull, PhD (formerly Susan Simpson-Laskoskie, née Susan Joy Simpson; born 1959), as of 2017, was the Superintendent of the Grand Prairie ISD; in 2014, Governor Perry appointed her to the State Board of Education for Educator Certification
2013: Carol O'Brien, issued August 14, 2013.
2013: Jacqueline Mercado (née Jacqueline Ortiz; born 1965), for helping children with disabilities; San Antonio
2013: Angela Lucky, Grand Prairie
2013: Lisa Billeck, Family Readiness Group Leader, for her support and dedication to the families of C Company, 3rd battalion, 501st Aviation Brigade, Fort Bliss, Texas during Operation Enduring Freedom.
2013: Margo R. Courreges (née Margo Doris Richards; born 1948) of Austin.
2013: Christy Woodward Kaupert (née Christy Woodward; born 1967) of San Antonio for her commitment to community service
2013: Rebecca Ann Figone (born 1971, maiden Johnson), military spouse and support of U.S Army over 20 year career. Received July 24, 2013.
2014: Kristen Hobbs, commissioned April 22, 2014.
2014: Ashton Montgomery for her advocacy and commitment to military families at Fort Hood Army Base, commissioned February 20, 2014.
2014: Jessica Gonzalez for her commitment to the military families at Fort Bliss Army Base, commissioned in 2014.
2014: Deniece Marshall, community service, Lufkin
2014: Elizabeth Laird (née Elizabeth Corrine Waldron; 1932–2015), a.k.a. "Betty the Hug Lady," of Killeen for her comforting hugs to Fort Hood soldiers
2014: Berneta Peeples (née Bonnie Berneta Peeples; born 1917) for volunteerism and public service. For more than 80 years (since 1934), Peeples was a journalist with The Belton Journal.
2014: Regina E Mankel for her contribution to Cobra Company 2-5 Infantry for volunteerism and public service.
2014: Dr.Victoria L Calder for her contribution to school safety and security in Texas schools and communities
2014: Erica Snyder for her commitment to the military families at Fort Hood Army Base. Received October 9, 2014.

Governor Greg Abbott

2015: Jalinna Jones (née Jalinna Anne James; born 1966), then Texas A&M Commerce First Lady, wife of the late Dan Richard Jones, PhD (1953–2016).
2015: Dawn Hatch, Texas Navy
2015: Mary O'Leary Kasales, recognized for her volunteerism & service to her community.
2015: Kathy L. Hanlon (née Hubbard) of Granbury, commissioned 22 October 2015, for volunteer work with veterans, nominated by The Honorable Brian Birdwell, State Senator, District 22.
2015: Brittany D. Hallman (born 1971), Gatesville.
2016: Corine Snow (Corine C. Craig; 1904–2016), from Sulphur Springs, received the honor on 28 October 2016, at age 111 years, 10 months and 27 days – reportedly, on record, the oldest living person in Texas, the 7th oldest in the United States, and the 46th oldest in the world. She died 5 December 2016.
2016: Martha Schroeder (née Martha Regina Gerling; born 1954) of Austin, Worked with Dept. of Human Services & the Texas Sunset Committee to promote & keep In-Home Daycare regulations for In-Home Daycare; Founding member & officer of Texas Professional Home Childcare Assn in 1989; Founding member of Austin Professional Childcare Assn; Worked 40 years in Early Childhood education, 30 of those years as a kindergarten teacher in public school; Teacher of the Year; Lifetime Girl Scout and volunteer in numerous local organizations. Austin Mayor made Proclamation declaring 2 May 2016 as Martha Schroeder Day.
2016: Lyn von Roeder (née Lynda Lou Warford; born 1948) of Austin, nominated by Admiral Mike Young, Squadron Deputy Commander of the Texas Navy
2016: M Jackson, recognized for over three decades of exemplary and selfless service to our country in varying positions of great importance and responsibility; a distinguished service characterized with distinction as a leader of Soldiers, a brilliant and honorable professional.
2016: Angela M. Steffens (born 1976), United States Army Volunteer (Ft. Worth, Texas); Battalion FRG Leader (949BSB, 45th ROC). The honor was received during the retirement of her husband from the 949th Brigade Support Battalion, 56th Brigade Combat Team, 36th Infantry Division, awarded for her unwavering support of military families for over 18 years, to include support during unit deployments to Operation Iraqi Freedom, and Operation Enduring Freedom.
2017: Sandra Rodriguez (born 1967), Mission High School educator and administrator; the honor received official recognition by the Texas House Resolution 764, of the 85th Texas Legislature, sponsored by Representative Sergio Muñoz, Jr.
2017: Cara L Ludwig (née Cara Lindsey Cook; born 1985), of Kennedale, for her efforts in Arts Education for the children of Texas and the greater DFW community.
2017: Evelyn Reininger (née Evelyn Genevieve Pehl; born 1927), longtime community volunteer of Austin, for her advocacy for more women in management positions. She was the first female engine manager at Bergstrom Air Force Base. She also worked alongside Lady Bird Johnson, Gov. Ann Richards, and journalist Liz Carpenter on the Federal Women’s Program
2017: Holly A. Mayfield (born 1978), United States Army Volunteer (Fort Bliss, Texas); Senior Spouse Advisor; the honor received official recognition by the 93D Military Police Battalion, 89th Military Police Brigade, for her enduring and unwavering support of military families for over 12 years, to include during Operation Iraqi Freedom (Iraq War), and mentorship of senior spouses at the United States Army Sergeants Major Academy, Fort Bliss.
2017: Eileen M. Hipe (born 1960), Deputy to the Commander, 418th Contracting Support Brigade (Fort Hood, Texas); Senior Contracting Official & Principal Assistant Responsible for Contracting; recognized for exceptional service in her direction of contingency contracting efforts by her organization to provide relief to Hurricane Harvey victims.
2017: Kristin K Edwards (born 1977), New Braunfels.
2017: Wendi R. Preusser (born 1977), Temple, TX. for significant contributions to her local communities including military wives, families and veterans. Served in numerous capacities as a Family Readiness Group Advisor and volunteered her time to help Army Spouses and Families during multiple deployments. She gave freely of her time to ensure others were taken care of.
2017: Laura A. Derry (born 1971), Served in multiple Family Readiness Groups and served as FRG leader for 100MPAD during 2004–2006
2017: Evangeline George (born 1930), Retired Science Teacher with 48 years of service to her community of Beaumont, Texas, dedicated volunteer in her community, mentor and friend to many in her community
2017: Kelsie Miller (born 1987), Served as the 31st Combat Support Hospital's Family Readiness Group Leader from 2015–2017. Recognized for her commitment, reliability and ability to go above and beyond for the families in the Unit during a time of deployment.
2017: Dannielle Chappell (born 1981) of Arlington, Texas. Awarded for her support and dedication to men and women of the U.S. Armed Forces, deployed and stateside.
2017: Christy Nash, Active Principal of Wichita Falls High School in Wichita Falls. Recognized for humbly giving over 34 years of service to the Wichita Falls Educational Community and known as a pillar of foundation for the School Districts Educational.
2018: Kristin Ada (born 1992 Killeen, Texas), recognized for her extensive service to her community.
2018: Dina C Williams, New Braunfels, for significant contributions to her local communities including military wives, families and veterans.
2018: Michelle D. Mahlstede (born 1973), Stockdale, TX, recognized for nurturing support and aid to Military Families and communities throughout Texas, the U.S. and internationally for over 22 years.
2018: Nelly Mulleneaux (born 1986), Master Resiliency Training (MRT) and Family Readiness Group (FRG) Leader, A CO 2-7 CAV 3 ABCT 1CD, Ft. Hood, (2015–2018) Known as "Arrowhead's Mom," Nelly Mulleneaux gave Soldiers and Family Members of "Arrowhead Company," the right guidance and motivation to remain resilient during adversity.
2018: Estella "Starr" (Chavez) Butler, Alumna of South San High School in San Antonio. Recognized for symbolizing the enduring legacy of supportive pride expected of a military spouse and being a stout defender of the preservation of Tejano history and culture.
2018: LaTonna Jones Wagner, (born 1962 Bonham, Texas), Registered Nurse, Director of Nurses for Additional Kare, Recognized for service to children with Rare, Chronic and Terminal Illnesses, advocate for families with seriously ill children. Outstanding and selfless service to the citizens of the State of Texas.
2018: Carol Ann Phillips Snyder,(born 1940 Dallas), retired Computer Software Consultant; President of Smithville Heritage Society. Recognized for almost twenty years of historical preservation and education for the people of Smithville and Bastrop County; and for over two years of historical research work for veterans' names honored in Smithville's Memorial Veterans Park.
2018: Diane Morrison, (born 1952) Registered Nurse, Volunteer Advisory Board member for Catholic Charities, transitional care and foster parent for 141 babies, Boy Scouts of America Volunteer, serves on the Longhorn Council BSA Executive Board, Council Training Chairperson, recognized for a lifetime of outstanding leadership and advancement of youth programs, and adult leadership training.
2018: Valerie B. Gordon (born 1977), United States Army Volunteer (Fort Bliss, Texas); Senior Spouse Advisor; the honor received official recognition by the 142nd Combat Support Service Battalion, 1st Armor Sustainment Brigade, for her enduring and unwavering support of military families for over 3 years, to include during Operation Resolute Support and Operation Inheritance Resolve (Afghanistan War), and mentorship of spouses and families for numerous deployments, Fort Bliss.
2018: Euleah "Deeann" Thorpe (born 1964 Lampasas)
2018: Alison Lund (born 1988 Corpus Christi), recognition for her volunteerism: extensive community service in several local, state, and national programs, military organizations- Family Readiness Groups (US Army) and the United Service Organization, and efforts to raise money for families affected by Hurricane Harvey in the Port Aransas.
2018: Nancy Ann Lee, wife and avid supporter of military families and veterans, for her work to support the military rescue efforts during and after Hurricane Harvey. Mrs. Lee successfully coordinated charitable sponsorships for supplemental meals from various restaurants for weeks of the multi-branch rescue efforts based out of the US Coast Guard base in Houston, Texas. Mrs. Lee was also an advocate of the Wounded Warrior Project and often assisted with public sector fitness event training.
2018: Naomi Mull (Elizabeth Naomi), San Antonio, from the Gulf Coast of Mississippi, for her work with LGBTQ youth, particularly her longtime commitment to one family, offering her support and guidance with navigating mediation of parent and child through discovery of sexual identity, gender association, depression and suicidal ideation. Recognized for standing by her sponsored teen through suicidal attempts, hospitalizations, one that was for the duration of an entire year and during that hospitalization the teen suffering through the tragic suicide of her mother. She remained a solid and reliable figure of support for this teen and her siblings throughout the ordeal and then helped with guidance through the discovery, assessment and process of gender reassignment surgeries. Continues support of sponsored individual who is now married and other family members of individual currently to date. Also a supporter and advocate of The Trevor Project having raised $833.18 to date for the foundation. Also recognized for her work with the San Antonio Humane Society for the volunteerism of her time, 8-10 hours every week onboarding, taking care of, and in general, for loving & caring for the forgotten and discarded animals that find their way to SAHS. She has raised a total of $4323.36 between the National Humane Society and San Antonio Humane Society to date. Lastly, for her work with the National Down Syndrome Society, both in Colorado Springs 2009-2012 and The Gulf Coast Down Syndrome Society 2012-present, supporting and raising money and awareness to their cause both online and by organizing & hosting fundraisers which also got community businesses involved by donating services for either throwing fundraiser or providing their products or services as prizes to attendees. She has currently raised a total amount of $3702.19 to date.
2019: Ernestine "Tina" Hernandez, New Braunfels, wife of a Wounded Veteran and longtime advocate for all Wounded Veterans.
2019: Porsche L. Abraham (Houston Texas), received The Commission of the Yellow Rose of Texas for her outstanding contributions as an educator and advocate for individuals with disabilities. Her extensive community service, including her work in creating opportunities for marginalized groups, has earned her several awards. Through her innovative educational programs and commitment to social entrepreneurship, Porsche has empowered individuals to develop life-changing skills, fostering economic independence and inclusion. Her dedication to making a lasting impact continues to inspire those around her.
2019: Jane Elizabeth Watkins Cohen, College Station, educator, leader, community volunteer, wife of Robert S Cohen.
2019: Courtney Lynn Walden (née Courtney Lynn Salzman; born 1979), from Fort Worth. Wife of 136th Airlift Wing Command Chief.
2019: Erica Alwine Molina, Simonton. Simonton Texas Emergency Management Coordinator, wife, mother, Volunteer and Director of the US Navy SEAL Danny Dietz Memorial Classic, recognized for her unyielding dedication to serving others.
2019: Joan N Bailey, El Paso, Wife, and supporter of military families and veterans, Served multiple units as both unit and battalion FRG leader during deployment of military spouses. She supported the military community for over 30 years.
2019: Pamela Hall, El Paso, wife, and avid supporter of Military Families for over 31 years. Both nationally, and internationally, she contributed to the success and morale of Military families for over three decades.
2019: Gaylon Finklea Hecker (née Gaylon Jean Finklea; born 1949) lives in Austin. Has written five books that preserve Texas History: “The Daughters, A Dozen Decades of DRT”, “Dusting Off A Legend: The St Anthony Hotel”, “Enhancing Quality of Life for 75 Years: Bandera Elective Cooperative”, “Bonjour, Y’All: A Squirrel’s Nutty Tale of the Texas French Legation”, “The Businesses That Built San Antonio”. Co-author of "Growing Up in the Lone Star State: Notable Texans Remember Their Childhoods," published by Briscoe Center of American History at UT-Austin. Past president of DRT William Barret Travis Chapter and is currently serving as First Vice President.
2019: Stasia Ohmie (née Stasia Nicole Smith; born 1977)
2019: Gretchen May Kimbro Tooke (née Kimbro) Austin, TX.
2020: Glenda Ervalyn McVeigh, The Hills, TX. Science Educator for 31 years; 60 years of support & dedication to military spouses, US Army
2020: Hope C. Soliz, San Antonio TX, for her outstanding work as a Key Spouse for the last four years in USAF. She is a USAF veteran, wife of Commander #C17 Steve Soliz and an avid supporter of Military Families.
2020: Mary Melissa Halbert Goodrich, West Lake Hills. Civic Volunteer; seventh generation Texan of 21 Republic of Texas ancestors; honored for preservation of Texas history; contributions include service at Texas French Legation; founding Vice President of Celebrate Texas Inc.; Daughters of the Republic of Texas; Republic of Texas Museum; Custodian General of Daughters of the Republic of Texas Headquarters; served three terms on the national board of the Daughters of the Republic of Texas.B.A. University of Texas at Austin, History, School of Liberal Arts
2020: Hon. Donna Bahorich, Houston, TX, for her significant contributions to her community and to Texas in the preservation of our history, the accomplishments of our present, and the building of our future as a former Chair and Member of the State Board of Education.
2020: Hon. Barbara Cargill, Conroe, TX, for her dedication as a science educator and her 16 years of tireless service on behalf of Texas school children as a former Chair and Member of the State Board of Education.
2020: Natalie Friend Wilson, Esq, Bulverde, TX, for 15 years of support and dedication to military spouses, the Air Force Key Spouse Program, Military Juris Doctorate Network, and the military community.
2020: Jaqueline Rae Quitugua, Fort Bliss, TX, for 23 Years as a Military Spouse and support of the 22nd Chemical Battalion, Ft. Bliss, Texas .
2020: Ingrid Wright Ortiz, San Antonio, TX, for 30 years as a Military Spouse and support to the US Army.
2020: Myrtle (Tippy) Foster, River Oaks, TX, on her 100th birthday, for her service to our country as a WWII USN Machinist's Mate at Alameda Air Station. Mrs. Foster was married to a veteran, Pomerene (P.A.) Foster, for seventy-one years and together they became involved with and supported the veteran community in North Texas for many years.
2020: Enola Gay Moorman Bounds Mathews, Sulphur Springs, TX, for decades of dedication to her community through radio and print, and preservation of its legacy of western music and lifestyle through performance, memorabilia, recordings and photos
2020: Jamie Weber (born on 20 December 1995) Current Law Student Austin, Texas
2020: Jennifer Wisniewski, Belton, TX, for service as a Military Spouse, scouting leader, and support of the 1-393 Brigade Support Battalion and the 120th Infantry Brigade, Fort Hood, TX.
2021: Christina Barnes, El Paso, TX. Entrepreneur, Mother, and supporter of military families and veterans. Served multiple FORSCOM as well as Drill Sergeant units as Company and Battalion FRG leader during peacetime and deployment of military spouses. Mrs. Barnes contributed greatly to the success of all units she supported and became a beacon for all spouses within those units for spouses as well as leadership.
2021: Brenda Kay King Turbeille, (born 1961) Winchester, Indiana, Nominated by Governor of Texas Greg Abbott and Colonel Tammy Hollister, USAF, for her 16 years of Federal Service to the United States Army and her commitment in helping soldiers of the Texas State Guard and their families at Camp Mabry but also dedicated her herself at helping the Fort Cavasos community.
2021: Angela Wilkin, San Antonio, TX, for 26 years of service as a Military Spouse, Scouting Leader, and Key Spouse for the 92nd Cyberspace Operations Squadron, JBSA-Lackland, TX.
2021: Merle Reue Hudgins of Wharton received a Yellow Rose of Texas award from Governor Greg Abbott along with a House Concurrent Resolution which read, "WHEREAS, Merle Reue Hudgins of Wharton has received a Yellow Rose of Texas award from Governor Greg Abbott; and WHEREAS, Established in the 1950s by Governor Allan Shivers, the Yellow Rose of Texas award recognizes Texas women who have demonstrated exceptional service to their communities; and WHEREAS, A fitting recipient of this notable accolade, Mrs. Hudgins has dedicated many years to documenting and sharing the history of Wharton County; appointed to the Wharton County Historical Commission in 1969, she has been an active member of the organization for more than 50 years and has served as its chair; she is the author of numerous publications on the county's history, including her book War Between the States Changed Texas Forever, and she was invited as a contributing author for the Handbook of Texas by the Texas State Historical Association; she gives freely of her time and expertise to organizations such as the Institute of Texan Cultures in San Antonio, and for many years, she has spoken at the annual banquet for the William H. Wharton Chapter of the Sons of the Republic of Texas; and WHEREAS, Mrs. Hudgins moved to Wharton with her family when she was a child, and returned to the area after college to pursue a career as a writer; in 1976, she joined the Wharton Journal-Spectator as a staff columnist, and her work has also appeared in the El Campo Leader-News; an alumna of Wharton County Junior College, she has served on the institution's board of trustees for more than a decade; in all her endeavors, she enjoys the love and support of her husband, Joe Dawson Hudgins; and WHEREAS, Through her exceptional efforts, Merle Hudgins has significantly contributed to the study of Texas history, and she may indeed reflect with pride on her many accomplishments; now, therefore, be it RESOLVED, That the 87th Legislature of the State of Texas hereby congratulate Merle Reue Hudgins on her receipt of the Yellow Rose of Texas award and extend to her sincere best wishes for the future; and, be it further RESOLVED, That an official copy of this resolution be prepared for Mrs. Hudgins as an expression of high regard by the Texas House of Representatives and Senate.
2021: Christine Del Rosario Oyler, (born 1979) El Paso, TX, for her commitment in helping not just soldiers and their families at FT Bliss but also dedicated her herself at helping the El Paso community.
2022: Cinzi Lavin, Fredericksburg, TX, musical dramatist; for exceptional charitable contributions and volunteerism, and for artistic achievements towards improving the present and building the future.
2022: Pamela Edwards Rouse Wright, Houston, TX, for her commitment and volunteerism in 35 years of service with the National Society Daughters of the American Revolution and other various lineage based and other philanthropic causes.
2022: Madi Franquiz, Dallas, TX, for her commitment to improving the present and building the future for Texas children. She has tirelessly dedicated her time and effort to better the lives of children across Texas through literacy and education, especially for underserved and underrepresented populations.
2022: Erin Fineberg, (born 1985) El Paso, TX, for her commitment in helping the soldiers and civilians of William Beaumont Army Medical Center and their families at Fort Bliss, TX. She tirelessly dedicated her time and effort to better the organization and helping the El Paso community.
2022: Charlotte Rupp, Frisco, TX, for her outstanding commitment, support and dedication as an Air Force spouse spanning over 35 years to military members and their families serving in the U.S. and overseas. Charlotte advocated for significant improvements to quality of life programs, such as adequate family housing, childcare availability, quality education, working spouse reciprocity, and access to quality healthcare for more than 115,000 military members and their families residing in Japan.
2022: Meredith Laine Horning, (born 1986), Fort Worth, TX, for her commitment as a Labor and Delivery Nurse through her contributions to the advancement of Fetal Demise Care for Bereaved Parents experiencing the loss of a child during pregnancy.
2023: Connie Garcia Vega Born: March 1973, California, United States Residence: Fort Stockton, Texas Occupation: Regional Medical Emergency Management Awards: Yellow Rose of Texas, Texas Department of Emergency Management Leadership Award. Connie Garcia Vega is an emergency management specialist known for her contributions to disaster preparedness and response in Texas. She has played a significant role in mentoring emergency management professionals, developing disaster response plans, and coordinating large-scale exercises for healthcare facilities and agencies. Vega was commissioned with the Yellow Rose of Texas, an honorary award presented by the Governor of Texas to recognize exceptional community service. She has also received the Texas Department of Emergency Management (TDEM) Leadership Award for her outstanding achievements in emergency preparedness. During the COVID-19 pandemic, Vega served as the Permian Basin Health Care Coalition Specialist for BorderRAC, where she was responsible for coordinating medical response efforts. She accrued over 3,500 volunteer hours in pandemic response while maintaining a full-time job. Her work extends beyond emergency management, as she actively participates in community initiatives, including the West Texas Food Drive. Vega has contributed over 3,000 volunteer hours annually, demonstrating a commitment to disaster resilience and community safety. Recognition & Impact: Vega’s efforts have led to improved disaster planning across the Permian Basin, where she assists facilities in training staff, preparing disaster response policies, and connecting agencies for coordinated emergency efforts. She serves on various committees and commissions, advocating for disaster preparedness awareness. At the 2023 Texas Emergency Management Conference, Vega was honored with the TDEM Leadership Award for her exceptional contributions to emergency management. The award was presented at a luncheon attended by "over 4,000 emergency professionals", including elected officials, first responders, and disaster response specialists. Her contributions have been recognized in local and state publications, including the Fort Stockton Pioneer, which highlighted her "Yellow Rose of Texas commission" and "TDEM Leadership Award".
2023: Laura Leigh Donhauser, Abilene, TX, for her 25 years of unwavering dedication to the military community. She performed exceptional acts of service throughout Texas, including supporting hundreds of Airmen and their families at Dyess AFB through multiple military deployments. Additionally, Mrs. Donhauser committed her time and talents to multiple church communities and the Del Rio Council for the Arts.
2023: Sarah K. Brandon, Dripping Springs, TX, for her tireless dedication to the residents of Hays County, particularly the local women’s shelter, the students of Dripping Springs HS, and the Hays County legal community.
2023: Mrs Melissa Speakes of Ft Cavazos, Tx Mrs Melissa Speakes received the Yellow Rose of Texas in May, 2023. She grew up in a patriotic Texas household and served Texas and the United States throughout her 14 years of service as a military spouse. Her support for Troopers, Families, and Veterans, especially for 1st Squadron, 7th Cavalry, 1st Cavalry Division has been exemplary and represent the best of Texas.
2023: Roschelle Dsouza, Katy, TX, for her commitment to resolve Kendleton, TX's food desert issue. As a junior in high school, Roschelle dedicated much of her time outside of school to raising money for Kendleton, visiting stores, and working with county officials to collect donations and raise awareness. After working with her community, and her partner Eesha Agrahar, she was able to donate over 3 tons of fresh and canned foods to Kendleton and start cultivating a community garden for residents to produce their fresh foods.
2023: Eesha Rao Agrahar, Katy, TX, for her tireless service to the residents of Kendleton, TX by first preparing and distributing hurricane preparedness kits to low income families and for addressing the food desert problem faced by many of its old residents who lack ready access to fresh produce. She was a junior in high school who dedicated much of her time outside of school by gathering support and donations from grocery stores, raising funds, and coordinating with community members to organize multiple food drives to help the hundreds of elderly and poor families of the community, and she worked closely with county officials to establish a community garden to grow fresh produce locally.
2023: Dr. Nisha Sundaragopal (Dr. Sun) BDS, DMD, MS, Katy, Texas for her timeless community service for helping the underprivileged, geriatric, disabled people of the community. She is a PACE mentor for Katy ISD and guided her students Eesha and Rochelle to provide with hurricane preparedness kits, food, for the residents of Kendleton and needville, Texas. Dr. Sun also provides patriotic for students to perform relentless community service and dedicate towards the betterment of USA. She also conducts cancer awareness walks in major cities to create awareness and to prevent cancer and save lives. She supports non profit organizations like helpahero.org for the veterans and home of hope for the sexually abused girls and women from the state of Texas. She also supports dental research by actively participating in implant studies past studies with University of San Antonio and helps in providing service for the mentally challenged and spectral children with autism.
2023: LaRachelle Samuel-Smith, Ph.D., Houston, TX, for her for 31 years as a Military Spouse and support to the US Army.
2024: Stephanie Carrillo Buras of Keller, Texas - Awarded in recognition of 20 years of dedicated service as a military spouse. The award recognized her sustained and diligent support of the United States Marine Corps and U.S. Marine Corps families through extensive volunteer service at multiple military installations across the United States and Japan. Throughout her twenty years as a military spouse, Stephanie contributed significant time and leadership to family readiness initiatives, community support programs, and volunteer organizations focused on enhancing the quality of life for service members and their families.
2024: Demelza Reichenberg, Seguin, TX, a USAF Veteran, for her service to the residents of Seguin and the surrounding areas. She brings her passion for animal rescue to South Texas by managing an Animal Sanctuary. She also spends a lot of time volunteering with Texas Order of the Eastern Star; doing fundraisers for local High School Seniors and taking care of her community through involvement with the elderly and supporting Patriot Paws. She works to help local Veterans get to and from appointments and advocates for their care. She does all this while working a full time position in healthcare IT.
2024: Norma Jean Giffin (formerly Bustamante), BA, MA (Saint Mary’s University, San Antonio, TX) of San Antonio, TX, for her many services with residents of San Antonio, her native city. She was honored by the Governor through her work with Delta Zeta Sorority, Chicktime of Converse, and yearly volunteerism with the Raul Jiminez Thanksgiving Dinner in San Antonio. She is a Senior Hospital Representative with Chiesi, USA, a privately held Italian Pharmaceutical Corporation. She has additionally received the honor of a Kentucky Colonel by Governor Andy Beshear, and has received the foreign honors of Dame Grand Cross (GCDO) of the Order of Prince Danilo I of Montenegro by Crown Prince Nicholas, Head of the House of Petrović-Njegoš, and Dame Commander of the Order of Saint James of the Sword (Brazil) by Prince Pedro of Bourbon of Orléans-Braganza.
2024: Linda A. Ruth, Lewisville, Tx, in recognition of her significant contributions through more than 30 years of public service and community involvement. Through the Denton County Sheriff's office she is an instructor for self-defense classes that are provided at no cost to women in the community. More than 1,000 women have learned self-defense from Linda, leading to a safer community, reduced crime, and lower law enforcement costs. Linda also runs the Ashton's Room program for the Lewisville Police department, providing specialized care for children who are temporarily under the care of the police department. This program has cared for over 150 children to date. She serves as a Survivor Advocacy Team member dispatched to emergency rooms and police departments for victims of domestic violence and sexual assault in Denton County and she is on the board of directors of Denton County Crime Stoppers. Linda volunteers over 500 hours each year serving her community. Professionally she has worked in local government for over 30 years. Linda has been recognized as a leader in local government and most recently she attained the Master Municipal Clerk designation, a distinction held by only 43 other people in the State of Texas. For the last 18 years, she has served the Town of Lakewood Village, Texas with unwavering commitment and professionalism. Her tenure has been marked by exemplary leadership, tireless dedication and a deep sense of responsibility towards her citizens and the community at large. Linda serves and represents our State well.
2024: Crystal Yang, Katy, Texas, in recognition of her work with blind and visually impaired students. Crystal founded Audemy, an educational platform for Pre-K to 5th grade blind/visually impaired students. Overall, Crystal works to create opportunities to bridge the gap between accessibility and education with technology.
2024: Lillie Hassey, Dallas, Texas tells a story of how she used to bring supper up to the crew as they built Harmony from the ground up, and she would set it out on a makeshift table of plywood and brick. Just as those materials helped build the foundational structure of the church, Lillie has served as a foundational member of Harmony and the surrounding community for its entire 70-year history. As a charter member of Harmony Baptist Church, Ms. Lillie Hassey has been a pilar of strength, kindness, and unwavering faith. In her seventy years at Harmony, Lillie has helped serve the community at large through outreach and ministry. Lillie has hosted countless Bible Studies in her home, inviting church members, neighbors, and anyone else she crossed paths with to come to her home and learn about the Bible, God, and enjoy fellowship with others. She along with her family have made significant monetary donations to the church so that they may serve more members of the community. Through her tenure at Harmony, Lillie has held many volunteer roles. Each having a unique gift that Lillie possessed. In her different volunteer positions she has served as a role model to her family, friends, church members, and the community at large. Lillie has been involved in almost every community outreach program the church facilitated. At 92 years young Lillie still hosts a Ladies Bible study in her home, she greets every new family that attends church, and she serves as a friendly face at every event the church puts on for the families in the local community. She has reached hundreds of families and women as a positive role model and a great example of how God loves his people. Throughout seven decades Ms. Lillie has accomplished so much and like the petals of a yellow rose- each unfolding layer reveals countless stories of joy, faithfulness, and friendships.
2024: Tesina Painter, Fort Worth, Texas, is a dynamic and compassionate entrepreneur who has made a significant impact on her community. A widow who raised four children while running successful home-based businesses, she is known for her creativity, passion for helping those in need, and ability to bring people together for positive change. Beginning her career in special education and later becoming a diagnostician, Tesina identified a gap for new moms in hospitals and launched a thriving business from home in 1993. She later founded Strata Commercial, bridging the worlds of commercial real estate and philanthropy with her innovative idea to auction street naming rights to raise funds for feeding those in need through Charity Road. Tesina's efforts extend beyond fundraising. She has helped provide workshops that empower food recipients to improve their lives. Her energy, creativity, and commitment to making a difference inspire others to get involved and be part of the solution.
2024: Princess T. Harmon, Killeen, Texas, Was awarded the Yellow Rose of Texas for her dedication and commitment to the 3,200 Texans and the other 25,000 U.S. Military members serving in the Republic of Korea. As a Religious Affairs Non-Commissioned Officer, she forged partnerships with 42 military leaders from the United States’ Eighth Army, along with the 8th and 51st Fighter Wings to strategically implement a suicide prevention and intervention program that has proven effective across the Korean peninsula. Her efforts have been instrumentally successful as she expertly allocated $106k to support 132 suicide invention programs and events that resulted in an 18% increase of resiliency among US Military Members in the Korean area of responsibility as measured by program research conducted by the Military. Her support and gallantry efforts were not only from an administrative vantage, but she was also personally involved, and hands-on in most of the 132 programs and events as they were happening live and on-the-ground. Her involvement and presence are indicative to the very nature of what it means to be Texan, whether at home or abroad in places like South Korea..
2024: Vanshika Prasad, Dallas, Texas, is a youth leader and empathetic entrepreneur who has profoundly influenced her community. As the founder of Mighty Little Us (www.mightylittleus.org), a nonprofit organization, she is dedicated to charitable initiatives, including fundraising for animal foster and adoption programs, organizing food drives, offering online art classes, and raising funds by selling handcrafted crochet pieces at art fairs. Through one of her passion projects, Scratch Sparks, launched in 2023 with support from local communities and libraries, she provides free workshops and classes on coding with Scratch, a visual programming language developed specifically for low-income and underrepresented communities. These classes are held at several public libraries around Dallas. Her efforts garnered widespread appreciation and encouragement, amplifying her impact. Over 300 students have participated in her classes, gaining valuable knowledge and thoroughly enjoying the experience. She approaches challenges with resilience and determination, never shying away from pushing boundaries and exploring new possibilities. Her community projects, focused on supporting youth and various organizations, are a testament to her remarkable character, compassion, and dedication. They reflect a profound sense of empathy and social responsibility, showcasing leadership and altruism that is especially remarkable at such a young age.
2024: Dianalou Princess Boone, Austin, Texas, for exceptional dedication to service, leadership, and community impact. As a United States Army veteran and Staff Sergeant, she served her country with honor and continues to serve with the same commitment in civilian life. She remains actively involved in community outreach, faith-based service, and educational support initiatives, consistently demonstrating a heart for others and a servant-leader spirit. Her integrity, dedication, and ongoing commitment to bettering the lives of those around her embody the highest values of the State of Texas.
2024: Lorin Sanchez-Neslony, San Antonio, Texas, for advocating on behalf of military families, spouses and children; as well as advancing efforts in public education, special education and disability services. Lorin also works to support military families by ensuring they are supported and thriving. Whether she is taking someone a meal, planning and executing events or being a voice for those who serve our country in uniform, Lorin does it selflessly and with a smile. She has given of her time for almost 20 years to ensure she leaves this world a better place than she found it. Military spouses and families are better for having Lorin as their tireless crusader.
2024: Lisa Quintero Adams, Austin, Texas, received the recognition for her extensive community service, including her advocacy for veterans and military families across Texas as the founder and CEO of Hats Off For Veterans, a nonprofit organization dedicated to supporting veterans through scholarships, professional development opportunities, mental health programs, and community outreach initiatives. She was also recognized for her work in hospice and end-of-life care, where she has supported patients and families during some of the most difficult moments of their lives. Her efforts in this field have focused on providing compassionate care, emotional support, and dignity for individuals navigating the final stages of life. The award highlighted Adams’ commitment to service across multiple sectors including healthcare, nonprofit leadership, and veteran advocacy, reflecting her ongoing dedication to improving the lives of Texans and strengthening community support systems throughout the state.

2025: Grace Ding, Katy, Texas, in recognition of her work with extending literature access to refugee and ESL students. Grace founded Inclusive Ink, a student-led organization, and has raised $40,000+ worth of pre-loved books. Her work focuses on diverse literature and access.

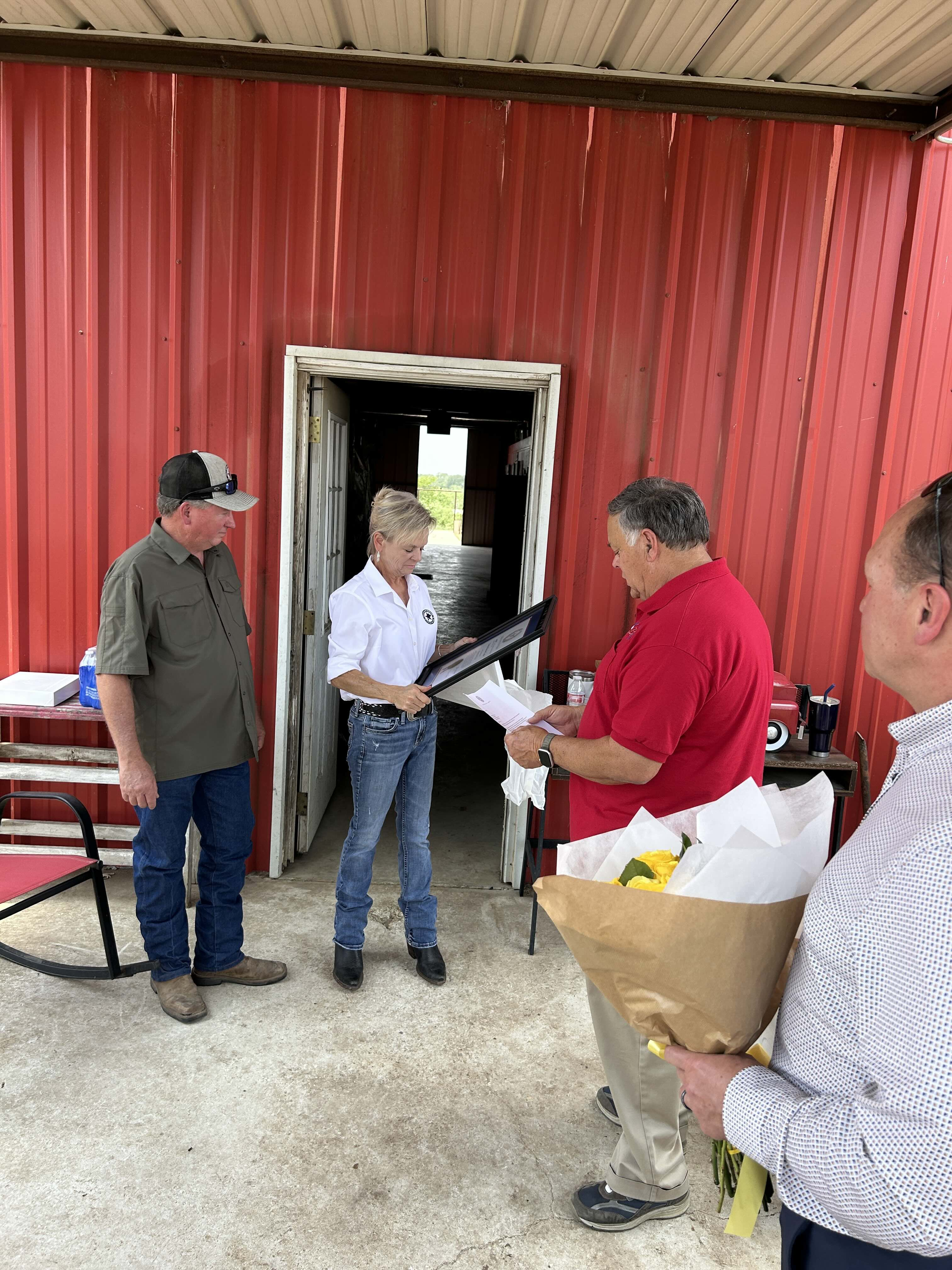
Mayor Walter Williams presents the Yellow Rose of Texas award to Donna Kiernan Carter at the Chris Krossing Ranch, New Berlin, TX on May 22, 2025.

2025: Donna Kiernan Carter, New Berlin, Texas for her work running the Chris Krossing Foundation, a non-profit equine therapy ranch. Donna, a Gold Star wife, lost her husband, SSG Chris Kiernan on 06-May 2007. Chris was KIA by small arms fire while serving in NW Baghdad as a tanker with 1st Battalion, 5th Cavalry Regiment, 1st Cavalry Division during OIF 06-08. In his memory, she founded the ranch and their motto is "where survivors gather." Each Spring they hold a Survivors Day event that brings together family members of those lost in the line of duty. Being in one place allows these families to grieve, honor and remember their loved ones as a community. This past March, 300+ family members attended.

2025: Beth Pickens, Austin, Texas is a 6th-generation Texan who has spent her life serving others. She is a Gold Star daughter of USAF LT Larry D. Vose (KIT 3 Apr 1959), and wife of retired Army LTC Jim Pickens (Ret). Beth was a State of Texas employee for 22 years. For 10 of those years, she was a registered nurse at the Austin State Hospital, which cares for some of the most vulnerable citizens of our state: children, and adults with mental illness. For another 10 years, she traveled across Texas as a nurse surveyor, ensuring the medical facilities of our state are safe. For decades, she has volunteered in many capacities for numerous organizations helping those in need, honoring those who served and sacrificed for our freedoms, and preserving the history of Texas. Her volunteer projects include: Honor Flight Austin, National Alliance for Mental Illness, Salvation Army feeding the homeless, Central Texas Tattoo Removal Clinic, Wreaths Across America, and One Tribe Foundation. She is a proud member of The Daughters of the Republic of Texas and of The Daughters of the American Revolution and has been volunteering with both organizations scanning, digitizing and indexing patriot records, many handwritten and from 250-275 years ago.

2025: Tracy Jiang, Katy, Texas, in recognition of her work as Social Media Director for Leading2Succeed, a student-led nonprofit that has raised over $16,000 for marginalized youth. Her work highlights the power of youth-led initiatives in advancing equity and community support.

2025: Angeline Ortiz, El Paso, Texas, in recognition of her 23-year service as a military spouse. The daughter of a Korean War veteran, Mrs. Ortiz faithfully and diligently supported the U.S. Army and Army families through extensive volunteer work and family outreach in El Paso, Killeen and San Antonio, Texas.

2025: Lisa Rochelle Zuniga, Harker Heights, Texas, is a sixth-generation Texan, musician, educator, and community volunteer. She is the wife of U.S. Army Major Kevin A. Zuniga and the mother of three children: Kayleigh, Desmond, and Marcus. Throughout her husband’s 21-year military career, she has devoted thousands of hours to serving military families, members & families in her church congregation, and communities across the State of Texas. During Hurricane Harvey in 2017, she helped create and manage a live rescue-dispatch mapping system that coordinated over six-hundred volunteers, mostly women, from around Texas, the US and the world to conduct welfare checks on tens of thousands of Texans affected by the flooding and dispatch volunteer boat crews to those needing rescue. Her volunteer service has included leadership with Army Soldier and Family Readiness Groups, Team Rubicon, Samaritan’s Purse, the Central Texas Food Bank, The Mission Continues, the Bluebonnet Philharmonic Orchestra, Harker Heights Parks & Recreation, Wigs for Kids, numerous leadership positions within The Church of Jesus Christ of Latter-day Saints—where she has organized youth programs, community service projects, and outreach events—as well as many other service opportunities in the Central Texas area. Her lifelong service reflects a commitment to strengthening families, supporting military communities, assisting in disaster relief, supporting music education, and improving the lives of others through volunteerism.

== Other Recipients ==
19??: Carolyn Wright, Chief Justice Fifth Court of Appeals of Texas
19??: Tara Watson (née Tara Ann Watson; born 1977), Staying Alive initiative (HIV/AIDS awareness), Lufkin, Dallas/Fort Worth
Sharon Teusink (née Sharon May Dykstra; born 1946), Northwest Houston
Teresa Champion (née Martínez), San Antonio, flamenco dancer, wife of world famous flamenco guitarist El Curro (pseudonym of William Champion; 1933–2012)
Mary Espiritu (née Mary De Leon; 1922–2011), retired Kelly Air Force Base executive
Betty R. Manbeck, American Legion Auxiliary volunteer, Houston
19??: Camille Rogers Clay (née Leila Camille Rogers; 1928–2012)
Bernice Conley (Bernice Green; 1923–2002), of Dallas, a noted Democrat political activist
Katherine Wilson (née Katherine Ophelia Thorp; 1922–2012) of Fort Worth for her volunteer service to the Boy Scouts of America
Anna Mae "Mas" Nichols (née Anna Mae Moore; 1919–2008) for her work with the Constance Allen Heritage Guild for Lifetime Learning
Wilma Davis (née Wilma Dean Voigt; 1933–2016) of Purves for her work with students at Tarleton State University
Cindy Weston of Fort Worth, TX for her community service in launching nurse-led care delivery models and increasing access to healthcare in Central Texas.
Bertha Mae Newsom-Jones (née Bertha Mae Newsom; 1927–2005), contributions to the Texas Council of Alpha Phi Alpha
Maureen Adams (née Maureen Louis O'Connor; born 5 March 1955), school principal, science educator, NASA Teacher in Space, Pathfinder 7, Killeen. Governor Perry also awarded Adams, and also astronaut candidate Edward Wright, Commissions as Admirals in the Texas Navy.
Lillian McKay, Humble, Texas
Tammie Smith for her efforts in having a reproduction of Davy Crockett's rifle to give away at a fund raiser for the Daughters of the Republic of Texas library
Betty Irene Buford, PhD (1928–2014)
Vivian Pickard (née Vivian Lela Townsend; 1918–2015) of San Antonio, member of the Alpha Phi Alpha wives auxiliary
Maggie Williams (née Maggie Lucy Singleton; 1938–2014) of Galveston an advocate for children, was honored for her work with the Texas Council of Alpha chapters for service and volunteer work
Marjorie Lee Coffey (née Marjorie Lee Chapman; 1925–2010) of Waxahachie
Mira Sotelo (née Edelmira Gutiérrez; 1935–2012) of Del Rio

== See also ==
- Texas Women's Hall of Fame
- Awards and decorations of the Texas government
