= Cora M. Beach =

American genealogist and historian

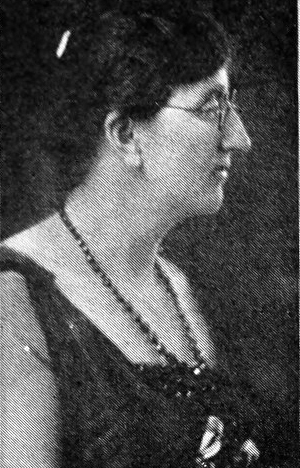
- Born: August 3, 1878; Ontario
- Died: March 1968 (aged 89–90)
- Occupation: Writer, nurse

Cora May Brown Beach (August 3, 1878 – March 30, 1968) was an American genealogist and historian, author of Women of Wyoming (1927).

== Biography ==
Cora May Brown was born on August 3, 1878, in West Oxford, Ontario, the daughter of James Emerson Brown (1854–1932) and Sarah Ann Nunn (1852–1937).

She was a graduate nurse and hospital superintendent.

She was a former resident of Michigan, and moved to Wyoming in 1907, living at Lusk, Wyoming. On December 6, 1906, she married Alfred Holmes Beach (1877–1946) in Lakin, Kearny, Kansas, and their children were: Alfred Holmes, Jr., Ann Harriet (1908–1944), Stewart Middleton (1910-1966), John E., Mary Elizabeth, James Hatten.

She was a genealogist and historian. She was the organizing State Secretary for American Legion Auxiliary for Wyoming and first National Executive Committeewoman for same organization.

She is the author of Women of Wyoming (1927). About $2000 ($36,203 in 2024 dollars) was raised to pay the expense of copying the census of 1870 of the state of Wyoming, and Beach was appointed chairman of the committee in charge of it. The census was taken when in Wyoming there was a population of 9,000. Beach travelled 11,000 miles in her car to procure the information which she reported in her book.

She was State Director of the Children of the American Revolution; State Chairman and member of National Committee of the Daughters of the American Revolution for Genealogical and Historical Research.

She was a member of the Order of the Eastern Star, American Legion Auxiliary, Daughters of the American Revolution.

She died on March 30, 1968, in Flint, Michigan, and is buried at Municipal Cemetery Orchard Mesa, Colorado.
