= Gladys Roldan-de-Moras =

Mexican-American painter

- Born: Monterrey, Mexico
- Education: University of Texas at Austin
- Occupation: Painter
- Children: 3
- Website: rolanddemoras.com

Gladys Roldan-de-Moras is a Mexican-American painter. She is the first Mexican woman to be inducted into the National Cowgirl Hall of Fame.

== Early life, family, and education ==
Roldan-de-Moras was born and raised in Monterrey, Mexico. Her grandfather, a businessman and ranch owner, was instrumental in getting charrería declared the national sport of Mexico.

She studied medicine at the Monterrey Institute of Technology and Higher Education, specializing in plastic surgery before switching to another focus of study and graduating from the University of Texas at Austin.

== Career ==
She paints images, people, and scenes that are inspired from Spanish and Mexican culture. In 2021, her painting Untitled (Traje de Luces) won the Sam Houston Award for Painting at the Briscoe Western Art Museum's Night of Artists in 2021, becoming the first time in the museum's history that an award recipient was decided unanimously by the voters. In 2023, she was the first Mexican woman to be inducted into the National Cowgirl Hall of Fame.

In 2025, she painted the official portrait of Pamela Rouse Wright, the 46th president general of the Daughters of the American Revolution.

Roland-de-Moras teaches oil painting classes in Texas. She is affiliated with Master-Signature American Women Artists and the American Impressionist Society and is a member of Oil Painters of America and the American Portrait Society.

== Personal life ==
Roland-de-Moras moved from Monterrey to Austin, Texas in 1984. She lives in San Antonio, Texas.

She is married and has three children.
