= Women's Suffrage National Monument =

Proposed sculpture

The Women's Suffrage National Monument is a planned memorial that will honor suffragists who organized and demonstrated for the women's right to vote in the United States. The monument is planned to be in Constitution Gardens at 19th Street and Constitution Avenue, near the Memorial to the 56 Signers of the Declaration of Independence.

The Women's Suffrage National Monument Foundation is leading efforts to build the monument. The Foundation was founded in 2018, and in 2020 it was authorized by an act of Congress to oversee the establishment of the monument.

The monument was originally proposed as the Every Word We Utter Monument, inspired by a sculpture designed by Colorado artist Jane DeDecker.

First ladies Rosalynn Carter, Laura Bush, Hillary Rodham Clinton, Michelle Obama, Melania Trump, and Jill Biden are honorary chairs of the Foundation. The Foundation's Executive Director is Anna Laymon. Pamela Rouse Wright and Ginnie Sebastian Storage, the 46th and 47th Presidents General of the Daughters of the American Revolution, serve as ambassadors for the foundation. Between 2024 and 2025, the Daughters of the American Revolution donated $1 million to the foundation.

In October 2022, Monument supporters began lobbying Congress to garner support for construction of the monument on the National Mall in Washington, DC. Senators introduced a bill that would provide an exemption to the Commemorative Works Act and allow its placement in the Reserve of the National Mall axis in March 2023. In 2025 the Women’s Suffrage National Monument Location Act became law; it states "This act authorizes the location of a monument on the National Mall to commemorate the women's suffrage movement and the passage of the 19th Amendment to the Constitution."

== See also ==
- Belmont–Paul Women's Equality National Monument
- List of monuments and memorials to women's suffrage
- List of national memorials of the United States
- Turning Point Suffrage Memorial
- Women's Rights National Historical Park
