= Denise Doring VanBuren =

American civic leader

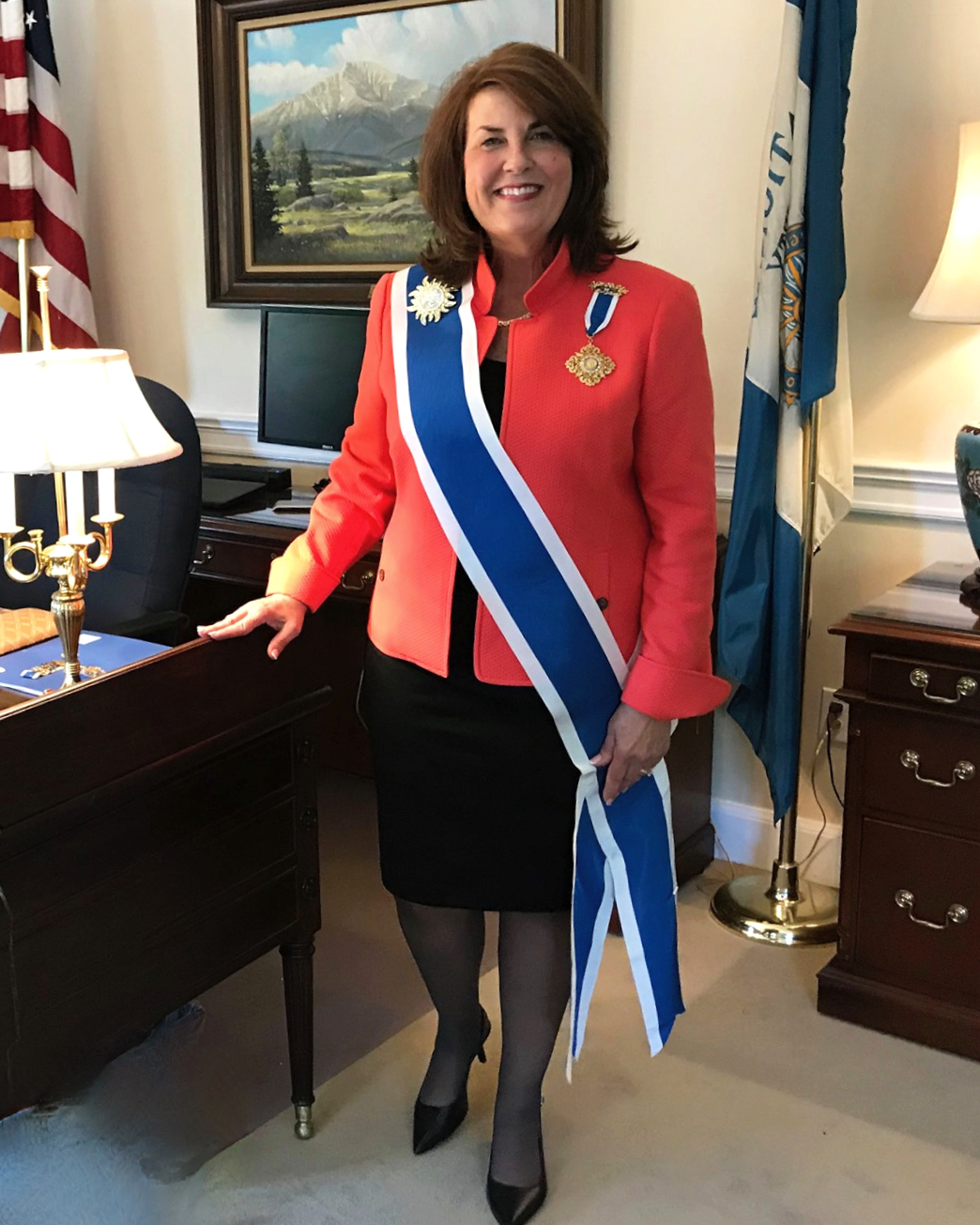

45th President General of the National Society Daughters of the American Revolution
- In office 2019–2022
- Preceded by: Ann Turner Dillon
- Succeeded by: Pamela Rouse Wright

Personal details
- Spouse: Christopher G. Barclay
- Education: St. Bonaventure University; Mount Saint Mary College (MBA)

Denise Doring VanBuren is an American civic leader, clubwoman, and former beauty pageant titleholder. She was crowned Miss Teen New York in 1979. VanBuren served as the 45th President General of the National Society Daughters of the American Revolution from 2019 to 2022.

== Early life and education ==
VanBuren grew up in Troy, New York. She is related to Hannah Van Buren, the wife of U.S. President Martin Van Buren, and a descendant of Jacob Plattner, a miller from Columbia County who fought in the New York Militia during the American Revolutionary War.

In 1979, she graduated from Catholic Central High School. That same year, she was crowned Miss Teen New York.

VanBuren graduated from St. Bonaventure University in 1983 with a degree in journalism, and then went on to obtain a Masters in Business Administration from Mount Saint Mary College in 1997.

== Professional work ==
In 1993, VanBuren joined the media relations group at Central Hudson Gas & Electric Corporation in Poughkeepsie, NY. She became a Vice President in 2000, ultimately serving as Vice President of Public Relations from 1993 to her retirement from that organization, effective January 2020.

== Daughters of the American Revolution ==
VanBuren joined the Daughters of the American Revolution through her ancestors, father and son Jacob and Marcus Plattner. She has been involved with the DAR in the City of Beacon, New York, then with the New York State organization before her role at a national level.

As Regent of the Beacon, New York, Melzingah Chapter from 1998 to 2001, VanBuren chaired the Executive Board and was responsible for the stewardship of the 1709 Madam Brett Homestead, the oldest building in Dutchess County. She was named New York State's Outstanding Chapter Regent in 1999. She led the Melzingah Chapter's efforts to erect a municipal bust in honor of George Washington in Beacon. In 2000, she led a hike to the top of Mount Beacon that involved more than 600 people rededicating Melzingah's 1900 monument to Revolutionary War soldiers.

She served in three State Chairmanships and as State Historian before serving as New York State Regent from 2010 to 2013. As State Regent, her theme was "Celebrate the Empire State. Excelsior!"

At the National Society, VanBuren served as Organizing Secretary-General from 2013 to 2016 and First Vice President General from 2016 to 2019. She served as editor-in-chief of American Spirit and Daughters from 2004 to 2019.

VanBuren was installed as the 45th DAR President General in 2019 during the 128th Continental Congress and continued in that role until 2022. She chose the theme "Rise and Shine for America" with the goals of "passionate purpose, increased membership and an improved public image." During her term the DAR held its first virtual Continental Congress on account of the COVID-19 pandemic. In June 2020 the NSDAR's Board of Management released the DAR's Continuing Commitment to Equality, in which the DAR "reaffirm[ed] to the membership and the public alike that our organization condemns racism." and stated that "Bias, prejudice and intolerance have no place in the DAR or America." In 2022, she attended the placement ceremony of a historic marker at the grave of Eunice Davis, a multiracial woman and daughter of an American Revolutionary patriot who joined the DAR in 1896.

She is also a member of the Daughters of Union Veterans of the Civil War, 1861–1865 and the Daughters of the American Colonists.

== Historical organizations and books ==
VanBuren served five terms as President of the Beacon Historical Society and co-authored two books on the history of the city, Historic Beacon (1998) and Beacon Revisited (2003). She served two terms as President of the Dutchess County Historical Society and two terms as President of the Exchange Club of Southern Dutchess.

== Board service ==
VanBuren serves on the board of the Mid-Hudson Regional Hospital, the Hudson River Valley Institute at Marist College, Boscobel, and Dutchess Tourism. She was the past chair of the board of Dutchess Tourism.
