= Children of the American Revolution =

Youth organization

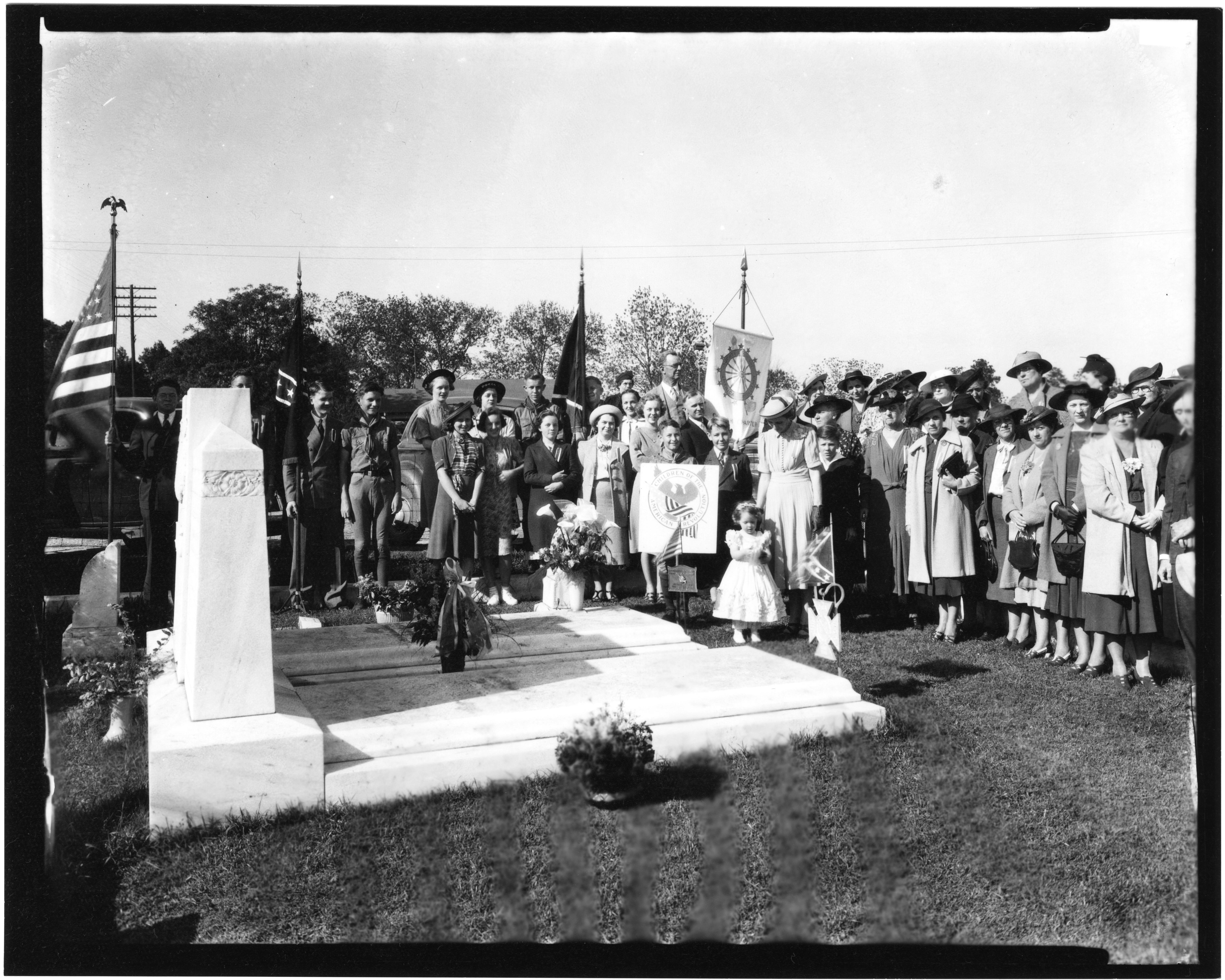
- Children of the American Revolution ceremony in Mississippi
- Abbreviation: CAR / NSCAR
- Formation: April 5, 1895; 131 years ago
- Founder: Harriett Lothrop
- Type: Non-profit
- Purpose: Family history society, American Revolution
- Headquarters: Memorial Continental Hall; Washington, D.C., United States
- National President: William Elston
- Senior National President: Jamie Burchfield
- Website: www.nscar.org

The National Society Children of the American Revolution (NSCAR) is a youth organization that was founded on April 5, 1895, by Harriett Lothrop. The idea was proposed on February 22, 1895, at the Fourth Continental Congress of the National Society, Daughters of the American Revolution (DAR). The organization was promptly chartered by the United States Congress, and is now the nation's oldest and largest, patriotic youth organization. NSCAR offers membership to anyone under the age of 22 who is lineally descended from someone who served in the Continental Army or gave material aid to the cause of freedom in the American Revolution.

There are three parent organizations: DAR, Sons of the American Revolution, and Sons of the Revolution. CAR Headquarters is housed in the Memorial Continental Hall. The National Headquarters houses a museum dedicated to NSCAR and American history, archives, a library, records, and a chapel.

== Founding ==
Harriett Lothrop (1844–1924) was a member of the Daughters of the American Revolution and the owner of The Wayside in Concord, Massachusetts (not to be confused with the Wayside Inn in Sudbury, Massachusetts). She was the author of several children's books and the widow of publisher Daniel Lothrop. She was a friend of Julia Ward Howe and the Alcott family.

She felt strongly that there needed to be an organization to teach children American history and patriotic values. She founded the NSCAR to accomplish these goals. Initially, all leaders in the NSCAR were adult members of DAR, but the leadership style evolved; now the organization is led by a National President, 13 National Officers, nine National Vice Presidents of the Regions, State Presidents, National Chairmen, and equal Seniors.

== Objectives ==
The NSCAR has six primary objectives in its by-laws; these objectives are the organization's foundation:

1. To acquire knowledge of American History.
2. To preserve and restore places of Historical importance associated with men and women who forwarded American Independence.
3. To ascertain the deeds and honor the memories of the men, women and children who rendered service to the cause of the American Revolution.
4. To promote the celebration of patriotic anniversaries.
5. To honor and cherish the Flag of the United States of America above every other flag.
6. To love, uphold and extend the principles of American liberty and patriotism.

== Membership ==
Initially, membership in the NSCAR was open to any girl (under age 18) or boy (under age 21) who was a descendant of a patriot who supported the cause of American independence. Current membership requirements are as follows:

“Any boy or girl under the age of twenty-two years is eligible for membership in The National Society of the Children of the American Revolution who is lineally descended from a man or woman who, with unfailing loyalty, rendered material aid to the cause of American Independence as a soldier, sailor, civil officer, or recognized patriot in one of the several Colonies or States, or of the United States, provided that the applicant is personally acceptable to the Society."

Members of the NSCAR are assisted and advised by adults known as senior leaders. Senior leaders are usually members of either the Daughters of the American Revolution, which in 2021 has 185,000 members, or the Sons of the American Revolution. Children learn leadership skills such as conducting a meeting using Robert's Rules of Order and how to hostess a formal tea party during which introductions are made and recognitions are given. For example, a formal tea party hosted on December 19, 1971, by the Alhambra San Gabriel Society of the CAR was covered in the News-Herald and Journal Green Sheet on December 19, 1971, featuring Mrs. Alvin Willard Kirkham, a member of the DAR and her granddaughter, Karen Earle Lile who at the age of 12 was noted in the paper as one of the officiators and hostesses, acting in the role of vice-president of the CAR chapter alongside President Richard Norman Boehle.

The NSCAR is an approved organization in the Hereditary Society Community of the United States of America.

== Creed ==
I believe in the Children of the American Revolution as an organization for the training of young people in true patriotism and love of country, in order that they shall be better fitted for American citizenship. As a descendant of the Founders of my Country, I believe that my birthright brings a responsibility to carry on their work, and that as the boys and girls of 1776 took an active part in the War for Independence, so the boys and girls of today have a definite work to do for their Country. As a member of the Children of the American Revolution, I believe it is my duty to use my influence to create a deeper love of country, a loyal respect for its Constitution and a reverence for its Flag, among the young people with whom I come in contact.

== Notable members ==
- Henry H. Arnold, military officer
- Jeannette Osborn Baylies, 31st DAR President General
- Cora M. Beach, genealogist and historian
- Ida L. Cummins, First Lady of Iowa
- Elizabeth Dole, U.S. senator
- John Foster Dulles, 52nd United States Secretary of State
- Ella Virginia Houck Holloway, President National of the U.S. Daughters of 1812
- Brereton Jones, 58th Governor of Kentucky
- Alfred P. Murrah, judge
- Jacqueline Noel, librarian and historian
- Janet Reno, 78th United States Attorney General
- Buddy Roemer, 52nd Governor of Louisiana
- Margaret Truman, singer and actress
- Julia Roberts, actress
- Ginnie Sebastian Storage, 47th DAR President General
- Lynn Forney Young, 43rd DAR President General

=== Fictional members ===
- Christopher Hayden (portrayed by David Sutcliffe), fictional character in Gilmore Girls and Gilmore Girls: A Year in the Life

== See also ==
- Sons of the Revolution (SR - 1876)
- Sons of the American Revolution (SAR - 1889)
- Daughters of the American Revolution (DAR - 1890)
- Children of the Confederacy (CofC - 1896)
