= La Prensa de San Antonio =

La Prensa Texas
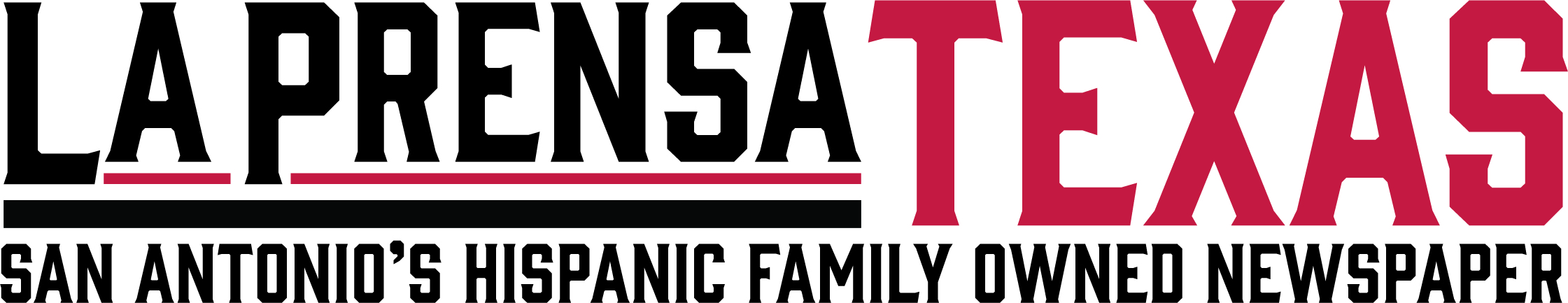
- Type: Newspaper; Weekly bilingual (Spanish, English)
- Owner: Steve A. Duran Sr.
- Founder(s): Tino & Amelia Durán
- Editor-in-chief: Roxanne Eguia
- Founded: 1989; 37 years ago
- Headquarters: San Antonio, Texas
- OCLC number: 32148445
- Website: laprensatexas.com

La Prensa Texas is an American bilingual semi-weekly newspaper based in San Antonio, Texas. Florentino "Tino" J. Durán (1934–2017) and his wife of seventy-one years (since 1954), Amelia ("Mellie") Durán (née Jimenez; born 1936), founded it in 1989 and are the publishers under the auspices of Duran Duran Industries, Inc., a Texas corporation formed March 17, 1989.

== Brief history ==
La Prensa Texas is not legally related to the historic San Antonio publication La Prensa that ran from 1913 to 1963, but the Durán's founded it to serve as a restoration, or as they put it, "a resurrection" — people connected with the publication have community and familial connections to people connected with the historic publication. Amelia Durán's father, Rogelio Jiménez (1914–1990), uncles, and grandfather worked for the original La Prensa newspaper as typesetters and printers from the 1920s through the 1950s.

== Management ==
Florentino "Tino" Durán

Before founding La Presna, Tino Durán held several public service positions, including Executive Assistant the San Antonio Mayor John Gatti from 1971 to 1973, Executive Director for the Housing Authority of Bexar County from 1975 to 1980, President of the National Association of Hispanic Publications from 1990 to 1995, and Executive Vice-President of the San Antonio Hispanic Chamber of Commerce from 1983 to 1985. In January 1994, Tino Durán was inducted into the Texas Newspaper Foundation Hall of Fame, which is sponsored by the Texas Press Association.

Amelia Durán

Recognition for Amelia Durán's community service includes a 1999 Hometown Hero Award presented by Time Warner Cable, the San Antonio Business Journal's Women's Leadership Award in 2004, the LULAC Recognition Award in 1996, and a 1998 Yellow Rose of Texas award presented by Governor George W. Bush. The Yellow Rose of Texas award, established in the 1950s by Governor Allan Shivers, is conferred through the Office of the Texas Governor to recognize exceptional women for contributions to their communities and to Texas in the preservation of its history, the accomplishments of its present, and the building of its future.

Next generation Duráns

Steve A Duran Sr (born 1957), Tino's son, is the CEO/Publisher. Nina Marie Durán (born 1981), Tino's daughter.
