= Ann Turner Dillon =

44th President General of the Daughters of the American Revolution

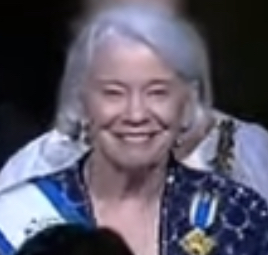
- Dillon at the 133rd NSDAR Continental Congress in 2024

44th President General of the National Society Daughters of the American Revolution
- In office 2016–2019
- Preceded by: Lynn Forney Young
- Succeeded by: Denise Doring VanBuren

Ann Turner Dillon is an American clubwoman who served as the 44th President General of the Daughters of the American Revolution. She was the first woman from Colorado to be elected as the President General.

== Personal life ==
Margaret Ann Turner was born in Texas, the daughter of Charles Nelson Turner and Blanche Piester. Her husband is United States Navy veteran William "Bill" Dillon. She is the mother of two and grandmother of six, including granddaughter Emily Dalgleish.

== DAR membership ==
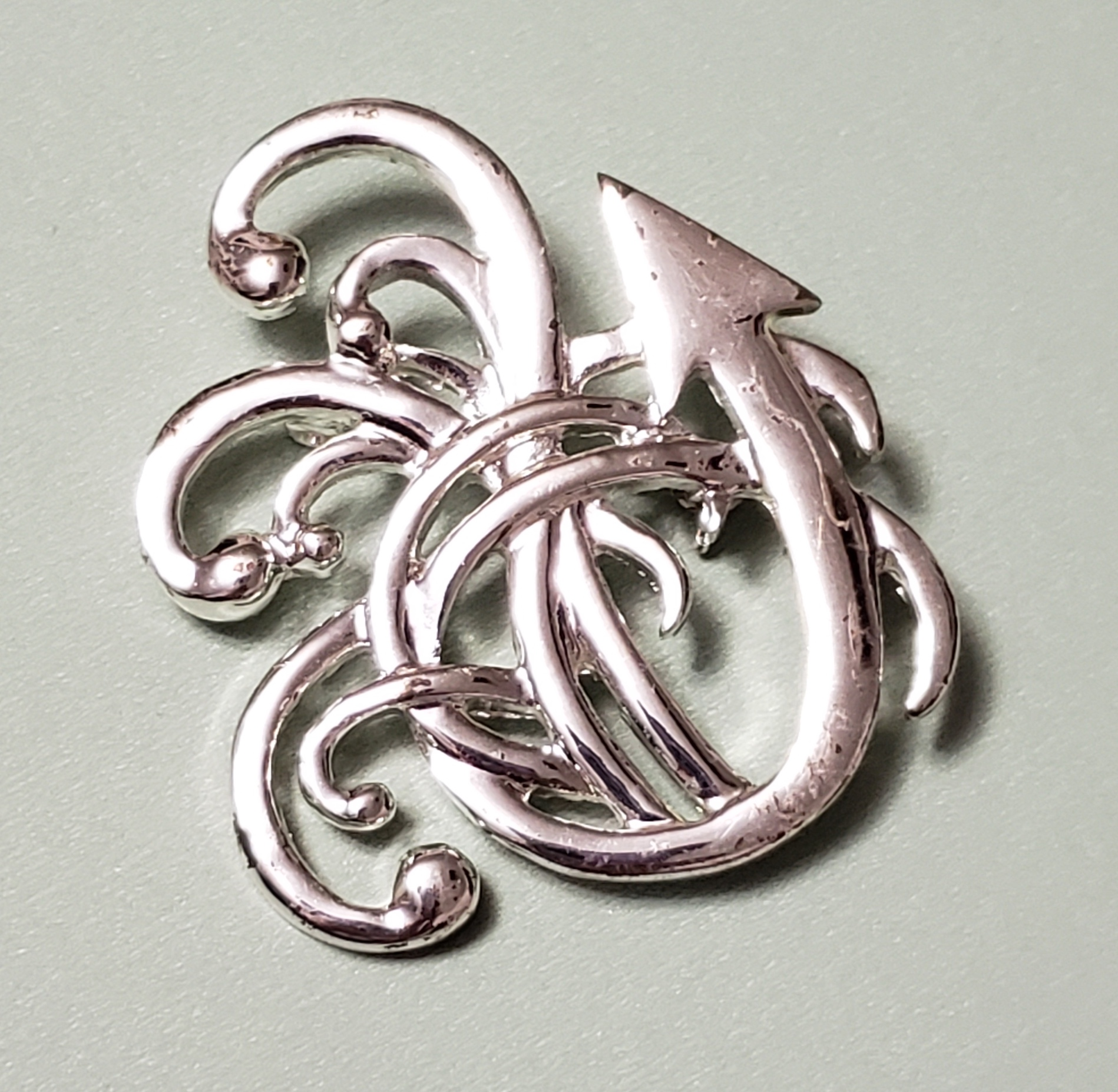
Silver Arrow, the symbol of the Dillon administration in the form of a pin.

Dillon was elected DAR President General in 2016, having previously served as First Vice President General, Registrar General, Colorado State Regent, and various other positions. She is a first-generation DAR member and is the first member from Colorado elected to the position. Her administration's theme was “Moving Forward in Service to America,” which continued the previous administration's emphasis on meaningful community service, but with more structured guidance and projects from the National level. Projects focus on education and training, including the creation of the Community Classroom Committee, and DAR training opportunities for members, including the New Members Course. She challenged DAR members to record 19 million hours of community service.

Highlights from the Dillon Administration:

- DAR Constitution Hall stage restoration
- DAR Museum Gallery and Study Gallery renovation
- Facility improvements at the DAR Headquarters, including new HVAC and Security Systems installed, new flooring in the O’Byrne Gallery and Administration Building, updated landscaping.
- Technology upgrades including the ability for chapters to pay National dues online, digitization of Revolutionary War pension through NARA.
- The creation of America 250! Membership Task Force and the State Application Teams to assist in expediting membership applications.
- The donation of 76 trees to Independence National Historical Park and the creation of the DAR Pathway of the Patriots as part of the U.S. Semiquincentennial Commission

== Other associations ==
- National Society United States Daughters of 1812 (former State President)
- National Society Colonial Dames XVII Century
