= Carolyn Wright (judge) =

Chief Justice of the Fifth Court of Appeals of Texas

Chief Justice for the Fifth Court of Appeals of Texas
- In office November 17, 2009 – December 31, 2018
- Appointed by: Rick Perry
- Preceded by: Linda B. Thomas
- Succeeded by: Robert D. Burns, III

Associate Justice for the Fifth Court of Appeals of Texas
- In office 1995–2009
- Appointed by: George W. Bush

Judge of the 256th District Court of Texas
- In office 1986–1995

Associate Judge of the Dallas County Family District Court
- In office 1983–1986

Personal details
- Born: Carolyn I. Wright; September 27, 1946 (age 79) Houston, Texas, U.S.
- Spouse: James Sanders
- Education: District of Columbia Teachers College (BS); Howard University (JD)

Carolyn Wright-Sanders (born September 27, 1946) is an American lawyer, jurist and a former chief justice of the Fifth Court of Appeals of Texas, serving in that position from November 17, 2009, to December 31, 2018.

== Early life and education ==
Wright was born in Houston, Texas, to Adell Willis Wright and his wife Alvora Christin née Lightfoot. She was raised in a career military family and during her childhood lived in a variety of locations in the United States as well as Japan. After high school she attended Strayer University, earned a Bachelor of Science degree from the District of Columbia Teachers College and later received a Juris Doctor degree at Howard University. She credits her father with encouraging her to attend law school. She received her J.D. degree from Howard University School of Law, which later granted her a Distinguished Alumni Award.

== Career ==
Returning to her home state of Texas, Wright founded her own law firm. In 1983 she became an associate judge in the family law courts. she ran for a family district bench two years later as a Republican. When she won she became the first African-American woman in Dallas to win a county-wide election.

Governor George W. Bush appointed her to the Fifth Court of Appeals as an associate justice in 1995. When Chief Justice Linda Thomas in 2009, Governor Perry appointed Wright to replace her as chief justice. Several hundred supporters and legal professionals attended her swearing-in ceremony on January 4, 2010, when she became the first African American to become chief justice of any intermediate appellate court in Texas. In her role as chief justice, she presides over 12 other justices in the largest intermediate court in the state and one of the busiest courts in the United States.

== Awards ==
Wright has received many awards, including the National Association of Women Lawyers’ Leadership Award; the American Bar Association Business Section's Award for contributions to women and proficiency in law; the Yellow Rose of Texas Award for significant contributions to her community. She was appointed by Governor Clements to the Governor's Commission for Women. Governor Rick Perry inducted her into the Texas Women's Hall of Fame in recognition of her 30 years public service as a civil, family and criminal judge.

== Personal life ==
She is married to James Sanders.
