= Mary Saunders =

American general (born 1947)

Mary L. Saunders
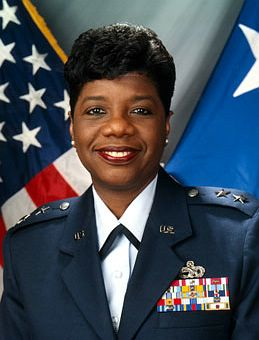
- Born: 1947 (age 78–79); Nacogdoches, Texas, U.S.
- Education: Texas Woman's University (BS); Rider University (MA); Air War College
- Military career
- Allegiance: United States
- Branch: United States Air Force
- Service years: 1971–2005
- Rank: Major General
- Commands: Vice Director, Defense Logistics Agency; Director of Supply, Office of the Deputy Chief of Staff for Installations and Logistics, Headquarters U.S. Air Force
- Awards: Legion of Merit; Defense Meritorious Service Medal; Meritorious Service Medal

Mary L. Saunders (born November 7, 1947) is a retired Major General from the United States Air Force. She was named to the Texas Women's Hall of Fame in 2012.

She was born in Nacogdoches, Texas and grew up in Houston. Saunders began her career at the Officer Training School at Lackland Air Force Base in Texas; she received her commission as a second lieutenant and began service in 1971. She earned a BSc in social work from Texas Woman's University and an MA in guidance and counselling from Rider College. Saunders attended Squadron Officer School and Air War College at Maxwell Air Force Base and the National Security Leadership Course at Johns Hopkins University.

She has been awarded several major decorations, including the Distinguished Service Medal, the Meritorious Service Medal with two oak leaf clusters, the Joint Service Commendation Medal with oak leaf cluster, the National Defense Service Medal with two bronze stars and the Korea Defense Service Medal. She was the first female officer to serve as Director of Transportation for the United States Air Force. Each year three Distinguished Service Chapter awards and the Excellence in Leadership Award scholarship are presented in her name.

After she retired from the Air Force in October 2005, she was named executive director for the Texas Woman’s University Leadership Institute; Texas Woman’s University also named her a Distinguished Alumni and a Woman of Distinction. In 2010, the Texas governor gave her the Yellow Rose of Texas Award.
