= Donna Bahorich =

American politician

Chair of the State Board of Education
- In office 2015–2019
- Preceded by: Barbara Cargill
- Succeeded by: Keven Ellis

Member of the Texas State Board of Education
- In office January 1, 2013 – December 31, 2020
- Governor: Rick Perry; Greg Abbott
- Preceded by: Terri Leo-Wilson
- Succeeded by: Will Hickman

Personal details
- Born: September 14, 1955 (age 71) Ronceverte, West Virginia
- Party: Republican

Donna Bahorich was a member of the Texas Historical Commission from 2021 to 2025, and a former member of the Texas State Board of Education, serving as chairwoman from 2015 to 2019.

== Early life and education ==
Bahorich was born in Ronceverte, West Virginia on 14 September 1955. She received her Master of Arts degree in 1990 from Liberty University and her Bachelor of Science degree in 1977 from Virginia Tech.

== Career ==
Bahorich began her career in 1977 in telecommunications working as a supervisor for Chesapeake & Potomac Telephone under the AT&T umbrella. In 1981 she was transferred to Mountain Bell to work as a contract negotiator responsible for procuring tools and telecom supply equipment after the break-up of AT&T. Bahorich left full time employment in 1985 to begin her career as a mother and, eventual, home educator.

She served as the founder and director for Home Ed Plus, Inc., a homeschool cooperative serving 100+ students in the West University area for over 20 years. She left her position on the board of Home Ed Plus in 2010.

In 2004, she became a volunteer director for the Harris County Republican Party. In 2005-2006, she was the campaign manager for Dan Patrick (current Texas Lt. Governor) for his first run for state senate. In 2009, she was selected to be the Harris County Republican Party 2010 Primary Director. Bahorich ran for the TXSBOE and was elected as the District 6 representative in 2012 and 2016. She was appointed by the governor as Chair in June 2015 and served on all three of the board's standing committees, finishing her final term of service as a member of the $34 billion Permanent School Fund Committee.

In 2017, the State Board of Education undertook the work of "streamlining" the curriculum standards in science and then social studies under Bahoriches' leadership as chair. Public controversies arose in both science and social studies revisions. Regarding the Alamo, Greg Abbott and other elected officials urged the TXSBOE to amend the committee-recommended history standard proposed for the state's seventh-grade that removed the "heroes" of the Alamo story. In an attempt to reduce the large number of historical figures required to be taught, TXSBOE work committees suggested a number of changes including trimming the number of historic figures required in the curriculum of Texas schools. In 2018, the TXSBOE approved the first in the nation high school Mexican American ethnic studies course, followed by the African American ethnic studies course in 2019.

In 2021, Governor Greg Abbott appointed Bahorich to serve on the Texas Historical Commission.

Bahorich was a member of the pastor's council at Houston Vineyard Church, the West Houston P-16 Council and served as president (and many other positions) of the Daughters of Liberty Republican Women. She is a Senior Fellow with the American Leadership Forum-Houston, Education Class 43, and was a member of Conservative Leaders for Education.

== Recognition ==
Bahorich was recognized by The League of United Latin American Citizens (LULAC) for the 2017 State Director's Leadership Medal, 2018 Leadership Award, and 2019 Consensus Builder Award. Bahorich has received other awards: 2019 Greater Houston Coalition for Justice Award Honoree; 2020 Governor Abbott commissioned her with the Yellow Rose of Texas award; 2021 the City of Houston recognized Bahorich for exceptional community service; 2021 Children At Risk nominee for Education Advocate of the Year.
