= Lena Santos Ferguson =

American civil rights advocate (1928–2004)

- Born: Lena Lorraine Santos; 1928; New Britain, Connecticut, U.S.
- Died: 2004 (aged 75–76); Washington, D.C., U.S.
- Resting place: Arlington National Cemetery
- Occupations: secretary, civil rights advocate
- Spouse: James H. Ferguson
- Children: 2

Lena Lorraine Santos Ferguson (1928 – 2004) was an American secretary and civil rights advocate. Ferguson was denied membership to a local chapter of the Daughters of the American Revolution in 1980 due to her race, after applying multiple times. She was admitted to the organization as an at-large member in 1983, becoming the third known African-American member. Ferguson pushed for the Daughters of the American Revolution to revise their national bylaws, leading to the organization banning discrimination based on race. She later founded, and served as chair, of the D.C. DAR Scholarship Committee. Ferguson was honored with a memorial plaque in the garden at DAR Constitution Hall in 2023.

== Early life and family ==
Ferguson was born Lena Lorraine Santos in 1928 in New Britain, Connecticut. She grew up in Plainville.

Her mother was the daughter of a white man, who was a sea captain from Maine, and a black woman from Virginia. Her father, of mixed African and Portuguese ancestry, emigrated to the United States from Cape Verde. Through her mother's family, Ferguson was descended from the American colonist Jonah Gay, who supported the American Revolutionary War as a member of the Friendship, Maine town committee.

== Career ==
Ferguson moved to Washington, D.C. in 1952 and was employed as an office worker with the United States Department of the Navy. In 1956, she began volunteering at Our Lady Queen of Peace Catholic School and was later hired as the school secretary. Ferguson retired from the school in 1995.

== Daughters of the American Revolution ==
In 1980, Ferguson applied to join the Mary Washington chapter of the Daughters of the American Revolution in Washington, DC. Despite being eligible due to her descent from Jonah Gay, her application was denied multiple times because she was black.

In 1983, she was admitted to the organization as a member-at-large. In 1984, Ferguson convinced the Daughters of the American Revolution to revise the national bylaws so that discrimination on the basis of race or creed was barred from all chapters, and Ferguson joined the Margaret Whetten chapter in DC. She worked with the organization to promote inclusivity and diversity, including pushing for the Daughters of the American Revolution to focus more research on patriots of the American Revolutionary War who were people of color. With the DAR Lineage Research Committee, she helped establish a lineage of eligible applicants related to Patriots who were African, African-American, Indigenous American, and of mixed heritage. This led to the creation of the Forgotten Patriots Project and, in 2002, an exhibition at the DAR Museum titled Forgotten Patriots: African American and American Indian Service in the Revolutionary War, 1775-1782 and a DAR Library seminar with the same name.

Ferguson also worked with the Daughters of the American Revolution to support students of color in Washington, D.C. through scholarship programs offered by the organization. She was the chairman and founder of the D.C. DAR Scholarship Committee.

Ferguson was the third African-American woman to join the Daughters of the American Revolution, following Karen Batchelor, who was admitted to a local chapter in Royal Oak, Michigan in 1977. Prior to Batchelor and Ferguson, a multiracial Black woman named Eunice Davis joined the society in 1896.

=== DAR Legacy ===
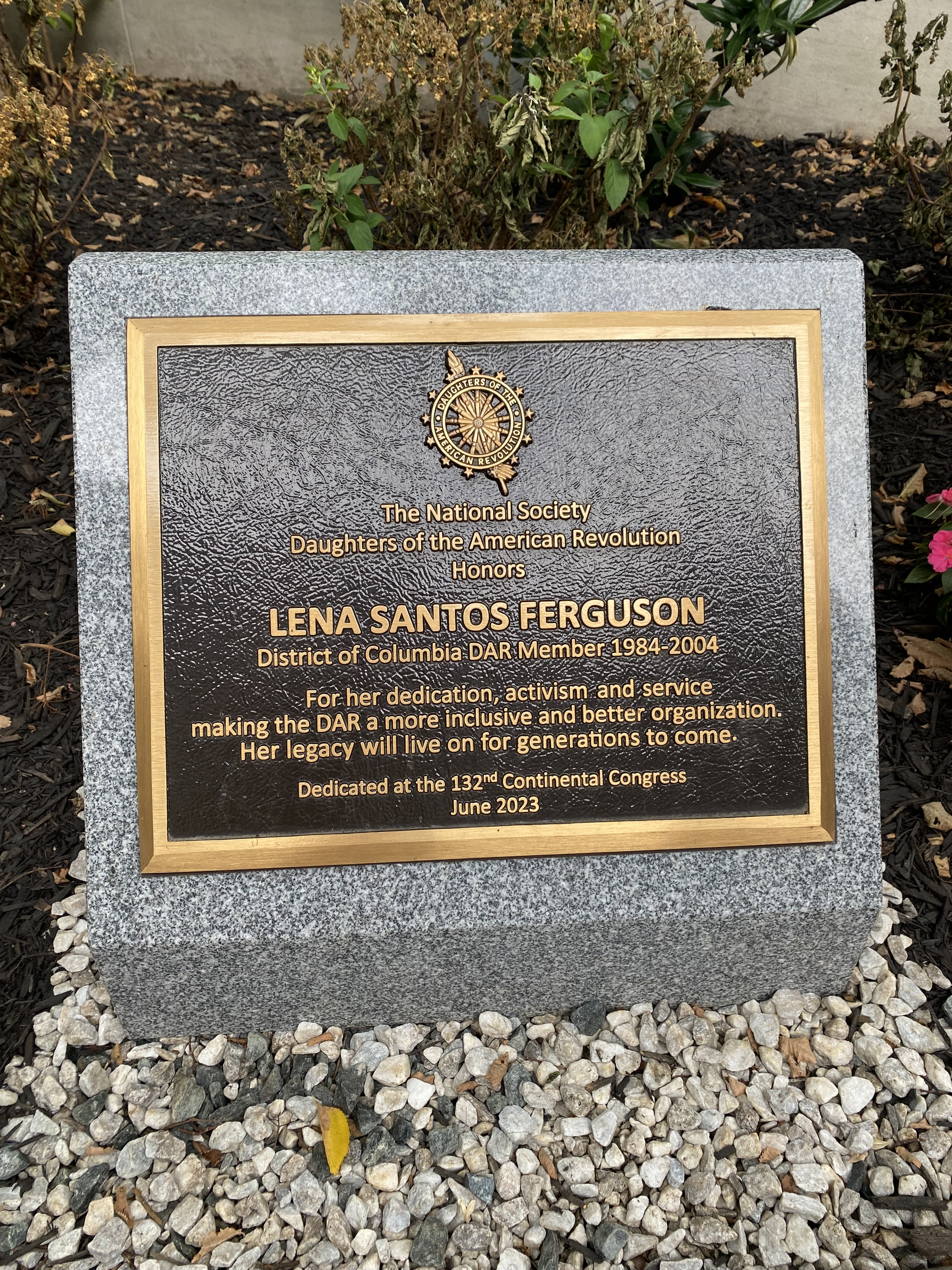
Commemorative plaque honoring Ferguson at the D.A.R. headquarters in Washington, D.C.

In 2023, the Daughters of the American Revolution renamed its Washington, D.C.-based nursing scholarships as the "Daughters of the American Revolution – Lena Ferguson Scholarship" in honor of Ferguson and her contributions to the organization. They raised the awards for the scholarship, which is awarded to two nursing students, to $5,000 annually. Also that year, DAR President General Pamela Rouse Wright commissioned a memorial plaque, honoring Ferguson, to be placed in the memorial garden at DAR Constitution Hall. President General Wright stated that Ferguson "was a pioneer, a change maker, and a woman who opened doors of opportunity for others."

In March 2023, U.S. Senator Chuck Grassley released a statement celebrating Ferguson's formal recognition by the Daughters of the American Revolution.

== Personal life and death ==
She was married to Corporal James H. Ferguson, an officer in the United States Marine Corps. They had two daughters, Serena DeSantos Ferguson Mann and Sonya Dianne Ferguson.

She was Catholic and a parishioner at Our Lady Queen of Peace Catholic Church in Washington, D.C.

Ferguson died of cancer at her home in Washington, D.C., in 2004 and was buried with her husband in Arlington National Cemetery.
