= Hudson River Valley Institute =

Coordinates: 41.7254°N 73.9327°W

- Logo of the institute
- Abbreviation: HRVI
- Headquarters: 3399 North Road, Poughkeepsie, New York 12601-1387
- Affiliations: Marist College
- Website: www.hudsonrivervalley.org

The Hudson River Valley Institute is a center for regional studies of the Hudson Valley of New York State. It is an academic extension of Marist College in Poughkeepsie, New York.

The academic institution provides internships for Marist history majors and contributes to local happenings, such as the Walkway Over the Hudson and the Mount Beacon Inclined Railway Restoration Society. Furthermore, they oversee Marist's publication of the Hudson River Valley Review, a journal of regional studies featuring historical research on the Hudson River Valley.

== Founding ==
The Hudson River Valley Institute was founded out of the necessity to preserve, protect, and interpret one of only forty Congressionally designated National Heritage Areas. The Hudson River has some of the oldest and most exciting stories to tell of American history, and the HRVI ensures that these stories are being taught.

The institute is supported by the National Endowment for the Humanities, among other organizations.

== Hudson River Valley Review ==
The Hudson River Valley Review is a journal of regional studies published by the Institute, featuring articles on the history and heritage of the Hudson River and research on regionalism. It is published twice each year, once in the spring and once in the fall.

It was started in 1984 at Bard College as The Hudson Valley Regional Review. Marist College assumed publication in 2003.

The Digital Library can be found on the HRVI's homepage and it contains full-text of issues going back to 2003.
