= Hereditary Society Community of the United States of America =

Non-profit organization

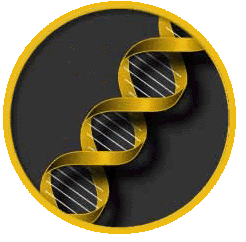
- Abbreviation: HSC
- Established: October 2002
- Founders: Barry Christopher Howard; John Griffin Richardson Rountree; Brantley Carter Bolling Knowles; John Hallberg Jones; Dixon A. Barr; Timothy Field Beard; Charles Owen Johnson; Stewart Boone McCarty, Jr. Eleanor Warrene Smallwood Niebell; Albert Clinton Walling II
- Founded at: Washington, D.C., U.S.
- Type: non-profit
- Headquarters: Washington, D.C., U.S.
- Website: hereditary.us

The Hereditary Society Community of the United States of America (often abbreviated as HSC) is a non-profit organization, founded in 2002, which conveys the public interface for over 300 lineage societies. HSC's primary mission is to facilitate and increase the community's aggregate focus on genealogical accuracy; access to information and research tools; accurate public listing of contact data; non-partisan civic outreach; historical education; scholarship; and fraternity and collegiality between organizations. The organization meets every April, in Washington, D.C., for an annual meeting and gala event.

== History ==
American lineage societies have existed since the colonial period and have provided avid genealogists and historians focused opportunities to study specific aspects of American history in juxtaposition with research into their own families. Prior to HSC, efforts to index the aggregate data related to American lineage societies included Bailey Banks and Biddle's (1917) American Orders & Societies and Their Decorations, John Griffin Richardson Rountree's (1970–1983) publication, The Hereditary Register, as well as a brief publication in the 1990s, The Hereditary Society Blue Book.

The HSC was founded by the heads of several main lineage society communities as a result of the lack of indexed publications and viable knowledge management platform. Their primary focus, at that time, was to increase synergy within the burgeoning community of disparate groups and provide a means to transition modern lineage societies and their members toward more equitable outcomes. The organization has maintained its commitment to inclusiveness and diversity and a consistent focus on making the study of genealogy relevant to the broadest array of the population. The organization was incorporated in October 2002 and held its first formal meeting in April 2003 at the Washington Club at Dupont Circle.

== Governance ==
The organization operates under the governance of a Council (Board of Directors) and a Cabinet (Advisory Board). The Council consists of fifteen individuals. Twelve are life appointments, and three consist of the sitting executive leaders, during their respective terms, of the Society of the Cincinnati (President General); the National Society Daughters of the American Revolution (President General); and the National Gavel Society (President). The ten original incorporators included Barry Christopher Howard (President); John Griffin Richardson Rountree (Vice President); Brantley Carter Bolling Knowles (Secretary); John Hallberg Jones (Treasurer); Dixon A. Barr, Ph.D.; Timothy Field Beard, F.A.S.G; Charles Owen Johnson, Esq.; COL Stewart Boone McCarty, Jr.; Eleanor Warrene Smallwood Niebell; and Albert Clinton Walling II, Ph.D.

== Activities ==
The website and subsequent social media platforms provide a broad outreach to the community. HSC also collaborates with numerous diverse lineage societies, coordinating an annual schedule of meetings. It also provides public access to a clearing house for accurately vetted contact and membership information, as well as a historical record of the insignia and regalia associated with the many groups within the community.

HSC and approximately 90 lineage societies hold annual board and membership meetings in Washington, D.C., each year in April. Since 2002, HSC has assisted with coordinating those meetings, providing guidance, and a highly trafficked calendar of events. This annual meeting period is called the 'Hereditary Fortnight', although it extends for three weeks from start to finish. The events of the Hereditary Fortnight have grown over time and were initially anchored around the annual meeting of the National Society Daughters of the American Revolution. In the 1940s, the DAR moved its annual meetings held at Constitution Hall to July, while the smaller lineage societies, in gradually increasing numbers, continued to meet in April in the ensuing decades to the present day.

During the Hereditary Fortnight, HSC meets at a formal (white tie) gala event. The evening allows officers from numerous lineage societies to meet together. Past venues have included the Willard, Anderson House, Cosmos Club, and, for the first eleven years of HSC's existence, the old Washington Club. Four to six prominent lineage societies leaders are recognized as Honorary Members of HSC at those gala functions. Each Honorary Member receives a perpetual listing on the website and a coveted HSC plaque, honoring their efforts. A retiring President General of the Society of the Cincinnati; a retiring President General of the National Society Daughters of the American Revolution; and a retiring President of the National Gavel Society, (if choosing to join the Council when eligible), as well as any recent, posthumous HSC Board member, are automatically elected to the Class for the year in which they retire or decease, in addition to the standard Honorary Members inducted that year. In determining prospective Honorary Members, the Council considers society leadership, membership, service, tenure, personal character, and life-long accomplishments.

In recent years, HSC has expanded its online presence to include two social media forums to accommodate real-time interaction between lineage society members from over 300 organizations. In 2020 and 2021, during the COVID-19 pandemic, HSC planned, coordinated, and hosted multiple live online discussions regarding the risks associated with the continuity of the Hereditary Fortnight, during the pandemic.
