= Governor Stephen Hopkins House =

Historic house in Rhode Island

- U.S. National Register of Historic Places
- U.S. National Historic Landmark
- U.S. National Historic Landmark District – Contributing property
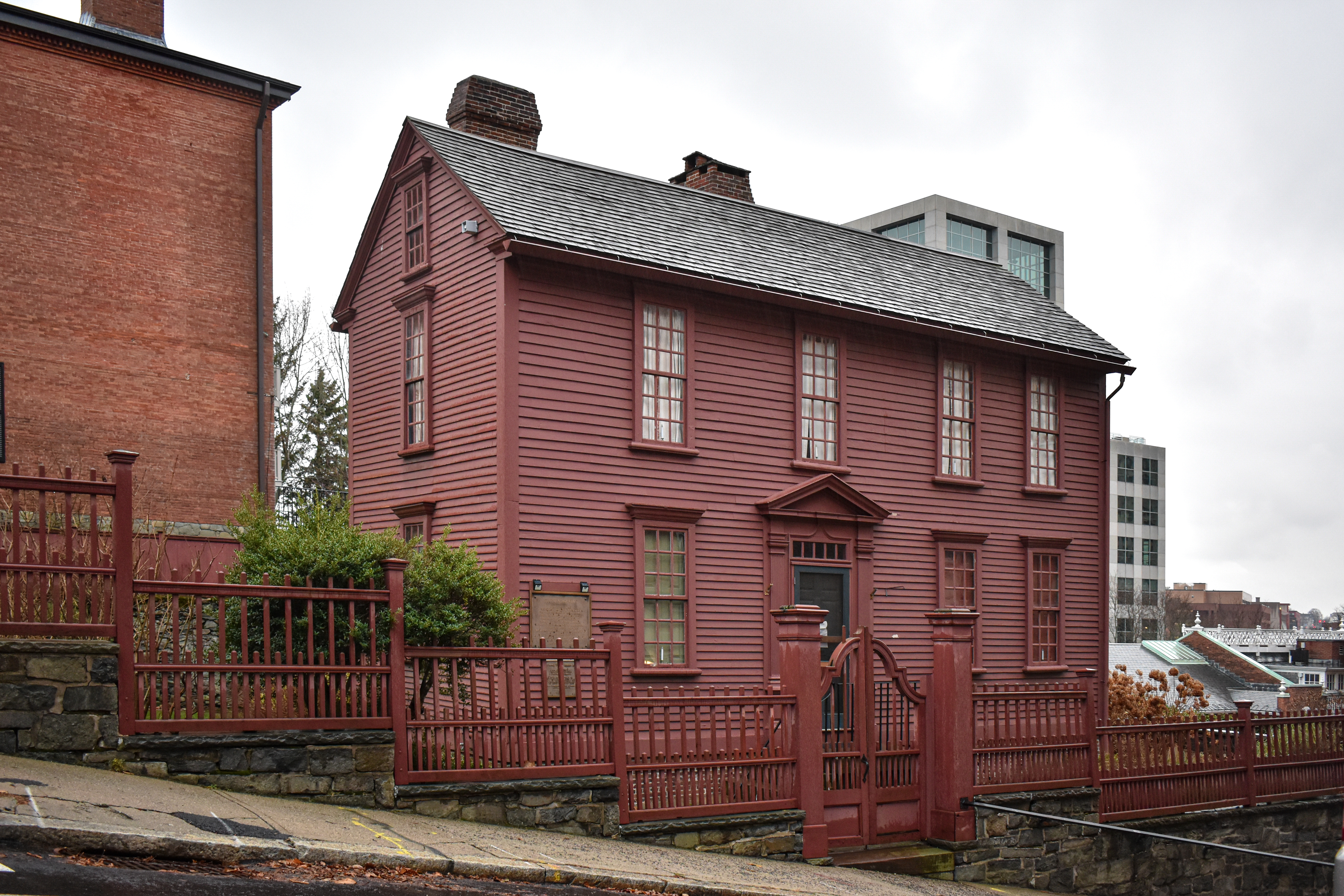
- Location: Providence, Rhode Island
- Coordinates: 41°49′18″N 71°24′12″W
- Built: 1708
- Part of: College Hill Historic District (ID70000019)
- NRHP reference No.: 70000022

Significant dates
- Added to NRHP: April 3, 1970
- Designated NHL: November 11, 1978
- Designated NHLDCP: November 10, 1970

The Governor Stephen Hopkins House is a museum and National Historic Landmark at 15 Hopkins Street in Providence, Rhode Island. It was the home of Stephen Hopkins, a governor of the Colony of Rhode Island and Providence Plantations and a signer of the Declaration of Independence.

== Description ==
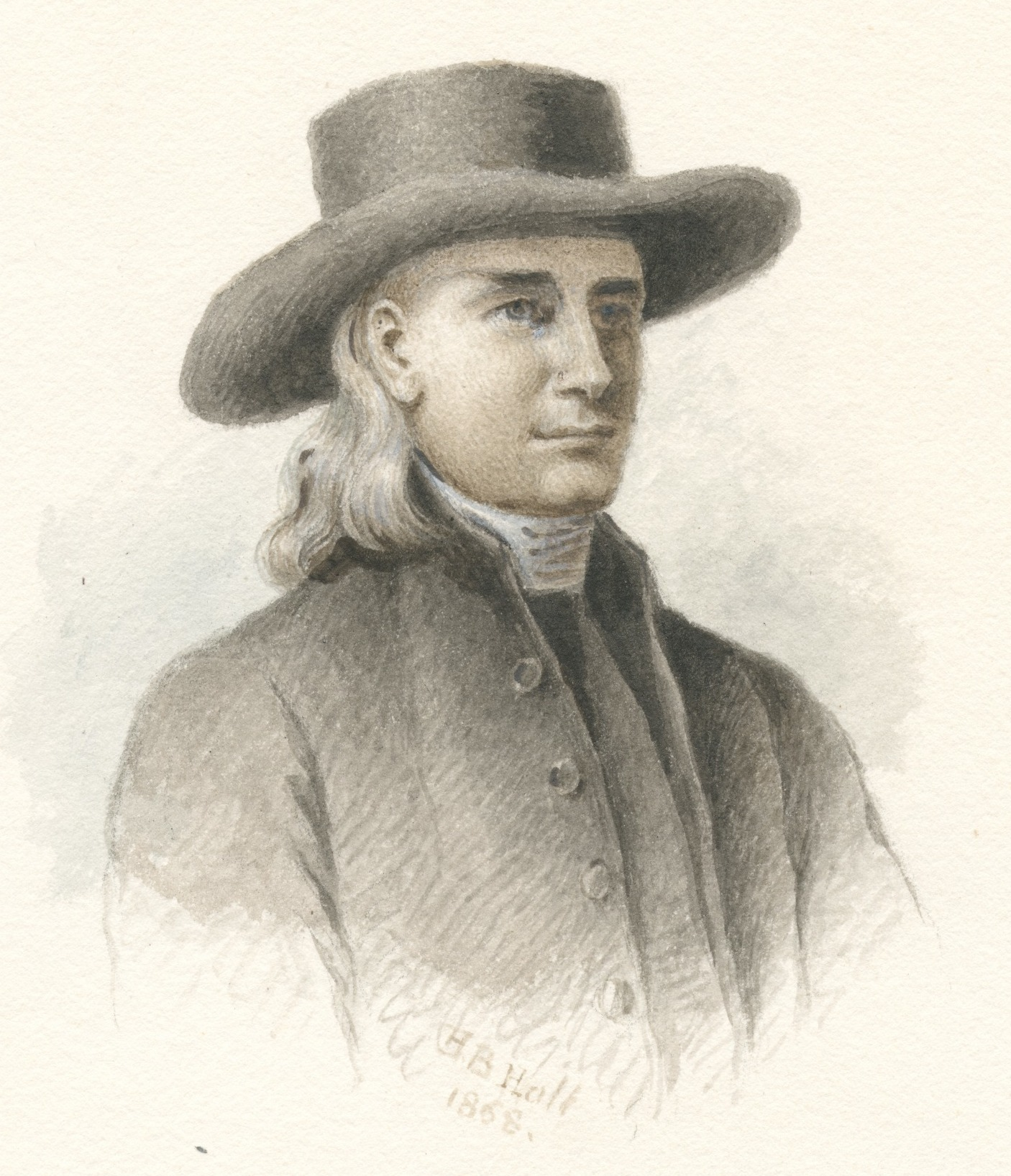
Stephen Hopkins

The Stephen Hopkins House is an L-shaped, 2½-story, wood-framed structure whose main block was built in 1742–43 for Hopkins, with an attached two-story ell whose first floor dates to 1707. The main block is four bays wide and two deep, with the main entrance in the second bay from the left. This entry is a 20th-century alteration; the original main entrance was through a doorway on the west side of the ell.

The interior of the main block has the main parlor on the right and Governor Hopkins' study on the left, flanking a central hallway with stair. Behind the parlor is a keeping room, with a small bedchamber behind the study. There are five bedrooms on the second floor, two with fireplaces. The downstairs fireplace mantels are paneled, with the one in the parlor slightly more elaborate.

== History ==
Stephen Hopkins purchased the original house in 1742 and enlarged it to its present size. It served as his home until his death in 1785. During these years, he served in the colonial assembly as a justice of the colonial high court, and as governor of the Colony of Rhode Island from 1755 to 1757. The house is the only significant structure associated with Hopkins' life.

George Washington visited the house on April 5, 1776 while traveling through Providence on his way to take command of the Continental Army in Boston. He was entertained by Hopkins' daughter, as Hopkins was in Philadelphia attending the Continental Congress at the time.

The house was originally built on the northeast corner of South Main Street (formerly Towne Street) and Hopkins Street (formerly Bank Lane). In 1809, it was moved halfway up the north side of Hopkins Street. It was moved again in 1928 to its present location on the south side of Hopkins Street.

In the late 1920s, the house was carefully restored by Norman Isham. It is now owned by The National Society of the Colonial Dames of America and managed by their local state chapter, as is standard for most NSCDA properties. It was open to the public as a museum prior to March 2020 but there are no known plans to reopen it. It was listed on the National Register of Historic Places in 1970, and declared a National Historic Landmark in 1978.

== Gallery ==
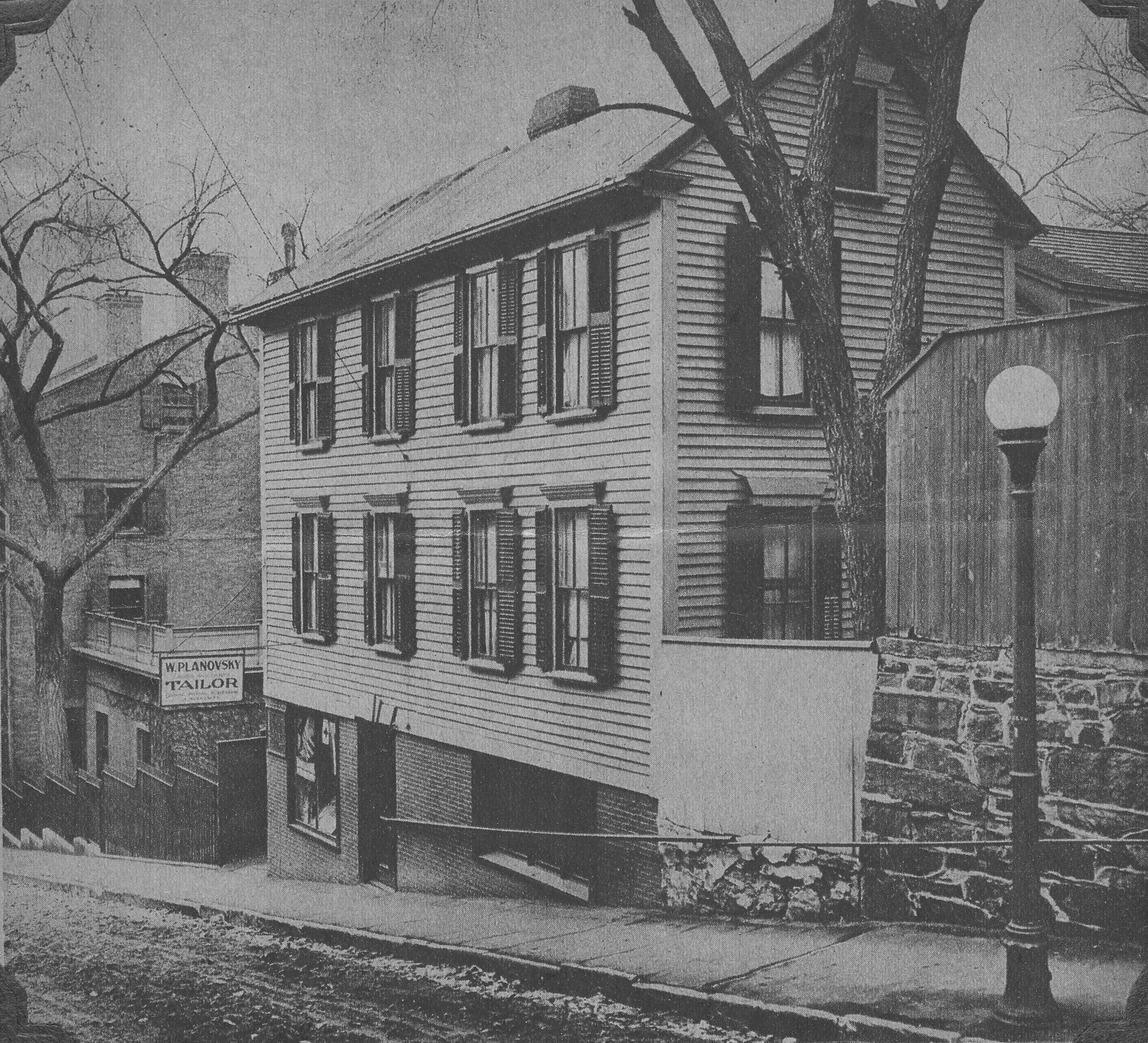
Photograph of the house taken before its final relocation to its current site.

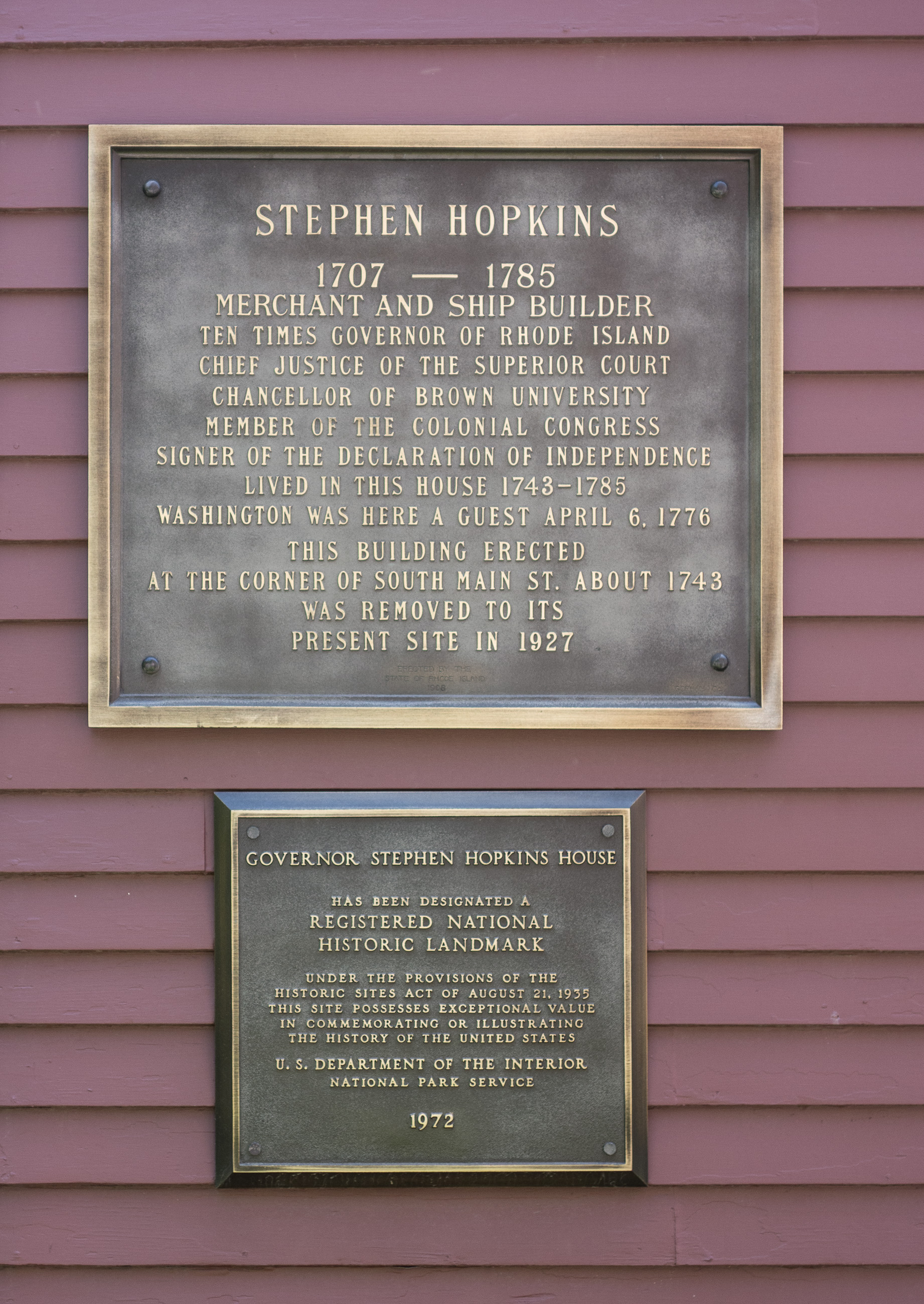
NRHP plaque on the exterior of the house

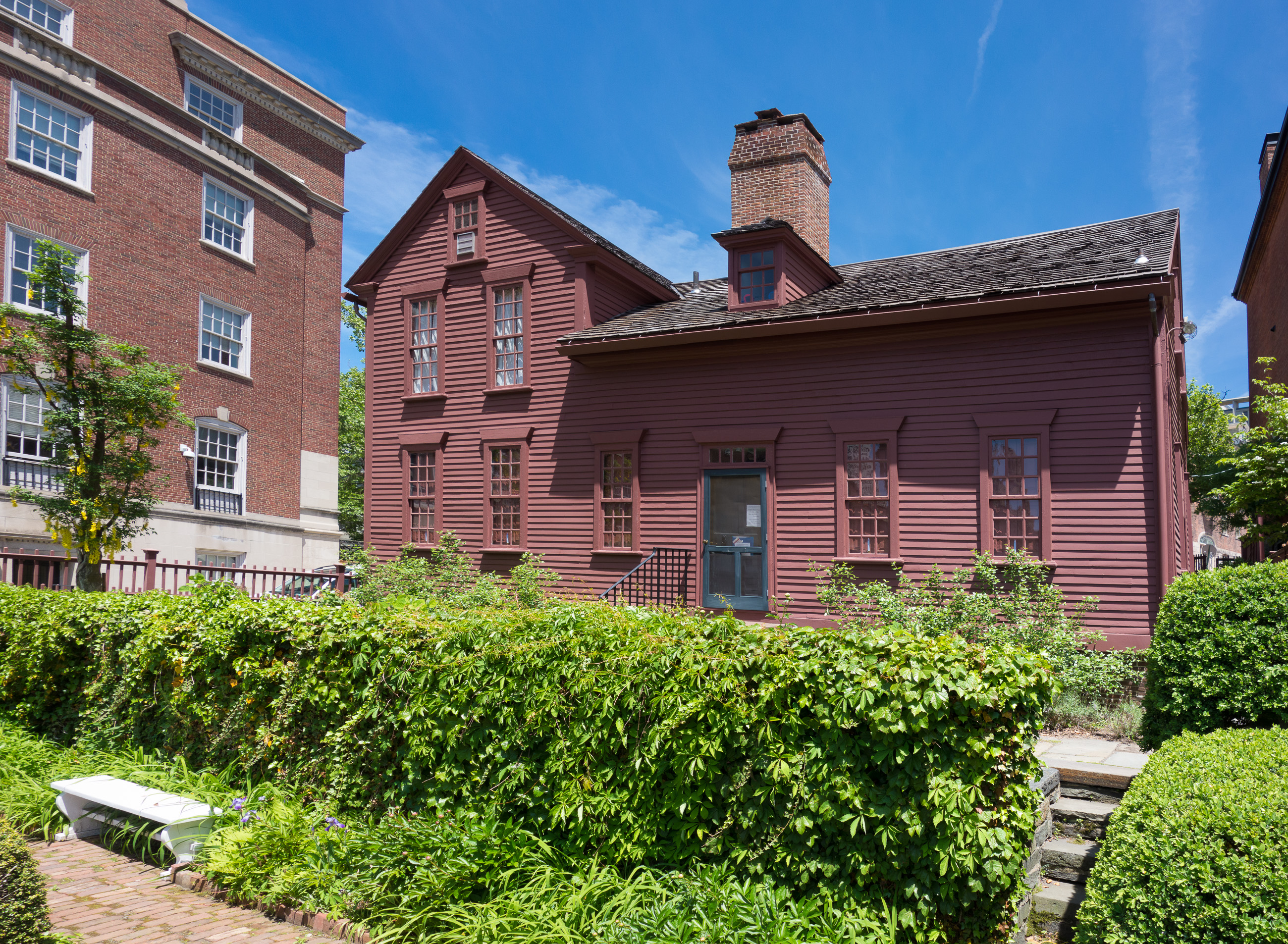
Rear of the house, showing garden area

== See also ==
- List of National Historic Landmarks in Rhode Island
- National Register of Historic Places in Providence, Rhode Island
