= Joseph Nourse =

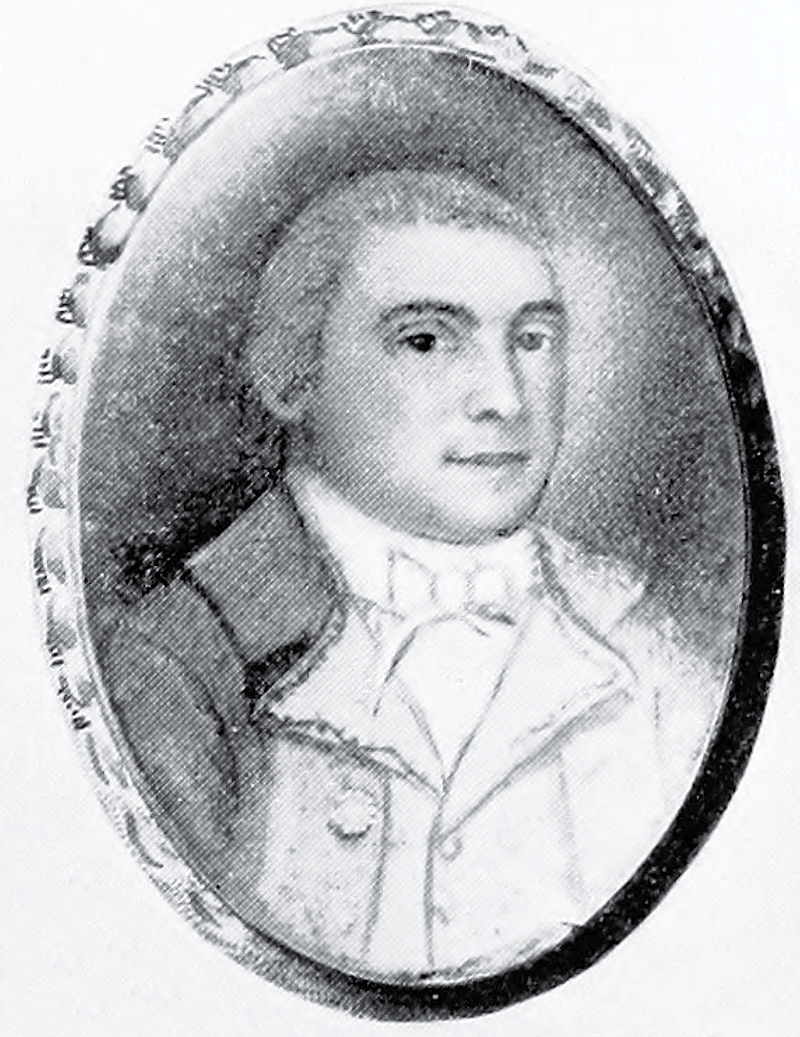
- Born: 16 July 1754; London, England
- Died: 1841 (aged 86–87); Georgetown, Washington, D.C.
- Occupation: Register of the Treasury
- Known for: First Register of the Treasury

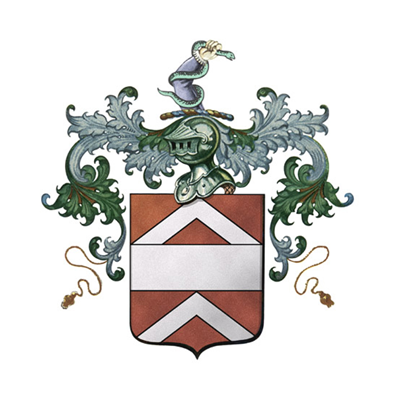
Nourse Coat of Arms

Joseph Nourse (16 July 1754 – 1841) was an American government official who was the first Register of the Treasury. With a career spanning forty years and six presidential administrations, he played a key role in administering the finances of the new Republic.

== Biography ==
Nourse was born in London, England on 16 July 1754. He first served during the American Revolutionary War as military secretary to General Charles Lee. He returned for a short time to his family's farm in Berkeley County, Virginia (now West Virginia). He settled in Philadelphia in 1779, where he served as assistant auditor general for the Board of Treasury. He was elected register in 1781, where he assumed responsibility for keeping the financial records and accounts of the new government. He also authenticated each piece of Continental currency by personally signing it.

In 1800, he moved with the federal government from Philadelphia to the Washington, D.C. He purchased a residence at 3101 P Street in Georgetown. In 1804, he acquired Cedar Hill, now known as Dumbarton House, where he lived until 1813.

As Register of the Treasury, he worked closely with four administrations and early political leaders of the new nation. On November 23, 1814, Vice President Elbridge Gerry suffered a heart attack while visiting Nourse. The Vice President later died at his home in the Seven Buildings.

When Andrew Jackson was elected president in 1829, Nourse was forced from office. A Congressional investigation claimed that Nourse owed the government $11,769.13 due to misappropriation of funds. Nourse countered that the government owed him for "uncompensated services". A Federal circuit court awarded him about $23,582, but it was seven years after his death until his heirs were able to collect.

Nourse was a slave owner. Both enslaved Black people and indentured servants worked at the Dumbarton House. He died in Washington, D.C. in 1841.
