= Burgwin-Wright House =

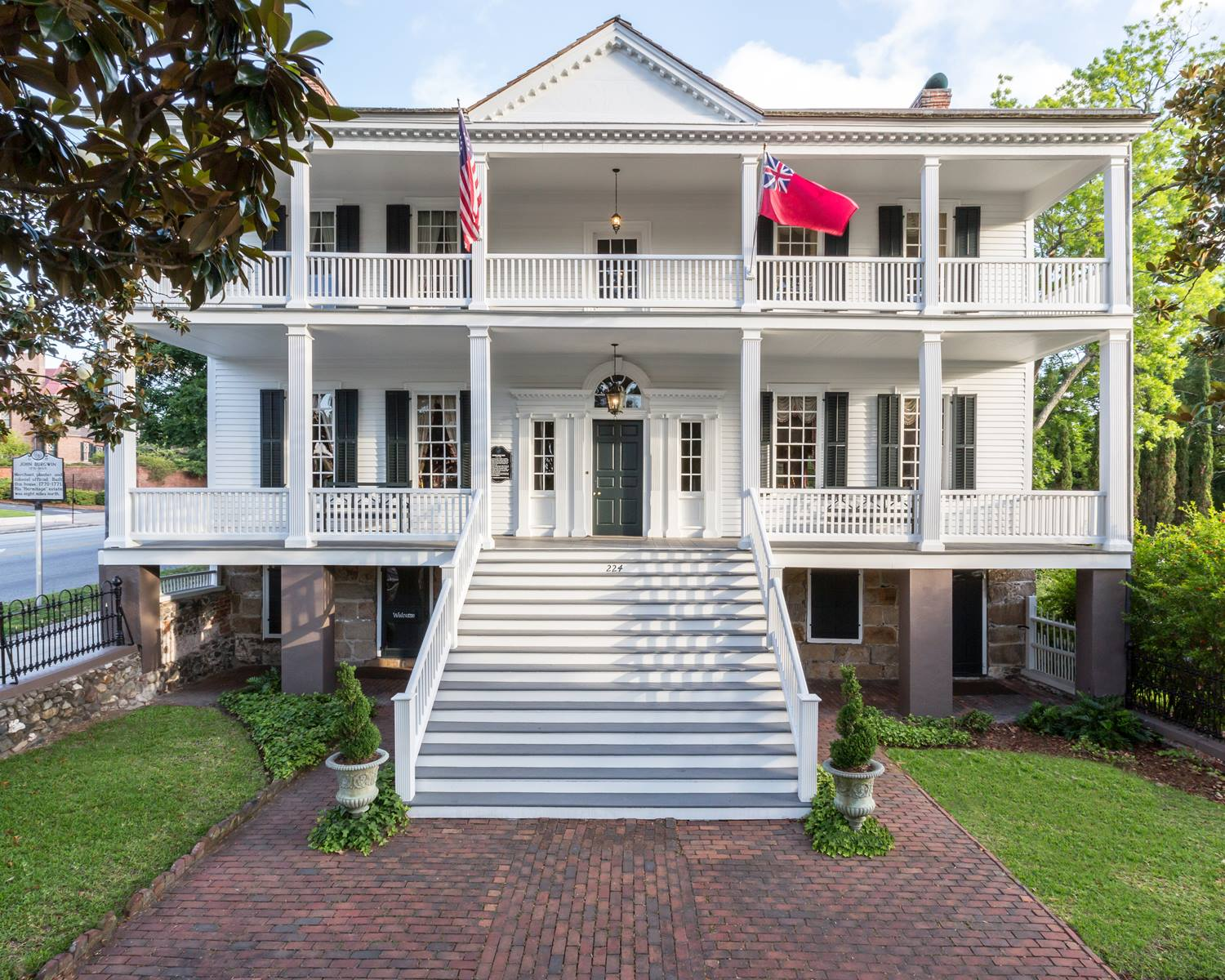
- Main façade of the Burgwin-Wright House, Headquarters of the North Carolina Society of the Colonial Dames of America

- Location within North Carolina
- Established: 1951 as a museum
- Location: 223 Market Street, Wilmington, North Carolina
- Coordinates: 34.235°N 77.946°W
- Type: Historic house museum
- Owner: North Carolina Society of the Colonial Dames of America
- Website: Burgwin-Wright House and Gardens

Built in 1770, the Burgwin-Wright House is the only structure in Wilmington, North Carolina, from the colonial era open to the public. Built for merchant, planter and government official John Burgwin, all rooms are furnished with 18th and 19th century antiques and showcase hundreds of objects. Built on the original walls of a former city jail, c. 1744, it retains many vestiges of its previous incarnation such as outdoor and sub-basement jail cells and a freestanding kitchen house with a massive hearth. Occupying two acres, the colonial style gardens consist of seven distinct areas, including an orchard with pomegranate and fig trees, a kitchen garden and a rose garden.

== History ==
=== 1770–1799 ===
John Burgwin was born in Hereford, England on February 25, 1730, as the second son to the senior John Burgwin. Burgwin's father promised the family estate to the elder son James so he was forced to make his own fortune. He first pursued his degree at Cambridge University. Burgwin arrived in Charleston, South Carolina sometime in the year 1750. He had letters of introduction on him from his father addressed to a friend he knew, George Inglis. By early 1751, Burgwin was employed by the office of Hooper, Alexander & Co. Soon after, Burgwin was sent by his employers to Wilmington for business and there became acquainted with Miss Margaret Haynes, daughter of the wealthy planter and merchant Captain Roger Haynes and Margaret Haynes. John and Margaret Haynes were married on 15 February 1753. Two years later, Margaret's mother transferred a thousand-acre plantation dubbed The Hermitage to her son-in-law. They lived there together until 1770, when Mrs. Burgwin died without having any children.

As a member of the provincial elite, John Burgwin was the recipient of many political appointments. He held the position of quartermaster for the New Hanover County militia in 1754, and was recommended for promotion to Cornet by his Captain William Mackenzie in 1755. Between 1756 and 1759 he served as clerk of the Bladen County Court, and from 1758 to 1761 he practiced law as an attorney commissioned before the Cumberland County Court. He became clerk of the governor's council in 1760, a position he held until 1772. By 1762, he was serving as private secretary to Royal Governor Arthur Dobbs, possibly until the governor's death in 1765. He was appointed Clerk of the Superior Court of Justices for the District of Wilmington in mid-1768. In 1767 he was appointed Treasurer of the Province of North Carolina and held this office under Governors Tryon and Martin. Governor Tryon appointed him Register of the Court of Chancery in May 1769, and the next day appointed him Master of the High Court of Chancery.

Other public positions Burgwin held included Wilmington town commissioner from 1769–75 and member of the General Assembly in Bladen County in 1773. He was also named Justice of the Peace for Bladen County in 1762 and for New Hanover County in 1764, made possible by the fact that his Marsh Castle property was located near Lake Waccamaw and allowed him to claim residency in both counties. On April 27, 1782, Burgwin married Elizabeth Bush, known as Eliza while in England. She was the youngest daughter of George Bush of Bristol, England, and came from a family of Quakers who lived at Ashley Barn in Gloucestershire. John was forty-seven and Elizabeth was twenty-five when they became engaged, but Burgwin was apparently hopelessly in love. In 1784 the Burgwins returned to America after leaving their son John Fanning Burgwin in the care of his grandmother. They landed in Charleston on April 9, and that night their daughter Caroline Elizabeth was born. In 1787 George William Bush Burgwin was born at The Hermitage. Eliza was subsequently very ill, and in her diary Caroline recalled that “it was deemed advisable to remove [her] mother to their town house in Wilmington” so as to “more readily receive medical aid.” But it was of no use and Elizabeth died on October 19, 1787.

Of his several homes, the only one that survives is that in downtown Wilmington, known today as the Burgwin-Wright House. It is believed that Burgwin purchased the lot at the corner of Market and Third St. in Wilmington's city center in 1769. The corner had been occupied since 1744 as the main jail in Wilmington, spelled "gaol" at the time. The structure was decommissioned by 1769, after which the town constructed a new jail in a different location, leaving the land remained largely vacant except for the ballast stone walls of the earlier structure.

It is likely that Burgwin wanted the prominent spot to build a house from which to conduct business while in town. Local historians have interpreted deeds to suggest that Burgwin was occupying the house by 1771. When Burgwin acquired the property, he acquired the remains of three original buildings that had been in connection with the 1744 city jail. One of these was the building upon which John Burgwin built his house. The second was a brick structure with two archways built into the structure that served as debtor cells, which had large, iron bars placed over the front for which to contain the prisoners. Remnants of some of the original iron can still be seen. The third building was possibly utilized as the residence for the jailer, who lived on site, and a family if he had one.

Unlike his main plantation house, the Burgwin-Wright was built first and foremost as a town house; the house was where Burgwin could conduct business and entertain while in town. Because of this, the house was meant to impress potential business partners and social peers. It was considered rude at this time to talk about how well your business was doing, so instead they showed it through their homes and furnishings. The house was used to entertain other wealthy families, business associates, and new merchants who traveled in the warmer months of the year. It also allowed the whole family to enjoy the activities in town such as balls and to see the new merchandise in the stores while escaping disease that plagued the plantations in the summer months. In the wintertime, only the head of the family and possibly his older sons came to town to conduct necessary business. The rest of the family remained at the main plantation or visited relatives in other areas.

John Burgwin built his house primarily in the Georgian style defined by its symmetry and sense of refined beauty. Georgian elements can also be seen in the fact that the façade of the house was originally identical to the back; there is a large front door with two windows on each either side that is mirrored by a large backdoor with two windows as well. The columns along the front of the house are also mirrored along the back. A prominent feature of the exterior of Burgwin's townhouse is the piazza. Architectural historian Catherine Bishir notes that they were important social spaces. While Charleston often had their piazzas secluded behind walls, in North Carolina they often projected into the streets. This made them a part of a shared community life, and allowed visitors to be seen by all members of the community.

Bishir also comments on the need for ventilation in coastal North Carolina, which she argues motivated some, including Burgwin, to adapt the Georgian style based on the architecture of the Caribbean. Many Carolina settlers had early starts in this tropical region, or had roots that extended to the area. That, coupled with the constant trade with the area for enslaved peoples, sugar, molasses, and other necessities, influenced the architectural elements seen in Wilmington today. Such elements includes the wide hallways to allow breezes to flow through the structure, tall ceilings, the prominent piazzas, an attic that allowed for rising heat to move away from living quarters, and a raised elevation.

The Burgwin-Wright house is elevated off of the street to stay above the constant flooding that plagued colonial Wilmington. While practical, the raised structure also allows the occupants to catch a breeze off of the water, as well as allow cross-breezes to travel through the house with large open windows and doors much more easily than houses at a lower elevation. In an era before electricity, natural sunlight was of course highly desired. A raised elevation also allows sunlight to enter the rooms without being obstructed by trees and bushes. The addition of windows and doors across from each other to allow a cross breeze to blow through the house. Large hallways allow hot air to easily travel through the open spaces, and a curved upper ceiling allows the hot air to travel easily into an attic space.

=== 1799–1930 ===
According to local tradition, John Burgwin began renting his house in Wilmington to Charles Jewkes, a former business partner, during his first extended trip to England in 1775 after his broken leg. Charles brought with him his wife Ann Grainger Wright, the widow of Captain Thomas Wright, and her three children from her first marriage, Thomas, 14, Mary, 10, and Joshua, 7. The legend also indicates that the Jewkes family remained there throughout the Revolution. When Burgwin decided to sell the house in 1799, and after Charles, Mary, and the eldest son Thomas died in quick succession, it was one of these children, Joshua Grainger Wright, who purchased the structure for 3,500 “Spanish milled dollars.” He moved in with his wife Susan Bradly, whom he had married in 1791, and their eldest son Charles Jewkes Wright.

Wright became a lawyer and a well-known orator. He was a member of the Legislature from 1792 until 1800 when he was elected Speaker of the House. Joshua Grainger Wright was elected the first President of the Bank of Cape Fear when it was founded in 1809. He lived in the house with his wife and children until he died in 1811. His wife Susan however, continued to live in the house until her death in 1842 with her children and their families. Thomas Henry Wright, one of Joshua's children, inherited the house from his mother after his eldest brother died. He married Mary Allan in 1825 and continued to live at the house until his death in 1861. Together they had eleven children within the house, though only eight survived infanthood.

Dr. Adam Empie Wright, the fourth child and eldest son of Thomas and Mary Wright, was born in 1833 and became the next owner of the house in 1861. He soon sold it to William Hamilton McRary for $5,000 in 1869. McRary lived in the house with his wife until his death in 1886. His wife Martha Wiggins, continued to live in the house until her death in 1907, bequeathing the house to her sister Rowena, who lived there until her death in 1930.

=== North Carolina Colonial Dames ===
The story of the North Carolina Society of the Colonial Dames of America began in Wilmington with Mrs. Florence Hill Kidder. In 1892, Mrs. Kidder worked tirelessly to raise funds and support for the North Carolina exposition at the 1893 World's Fair in Chicago. In the process, she met women from all over the nation, who were passionate about colonial history, many of whom were members of the newly founded National Society. Mrs. Kidder returned from the World's Fair determined to establish a branch. She brought together the Wilmington ladies that had donated colonial family heirlooms for the exposition to sign on as charter members of the state society. The National Society of the Colonial Dames of America in the State of North Carolina was organized on March 29, 1894, at Wilmington.

Upon Ms. Wiggins' death in 1930, the ownership of the Burgwin-Wright House transferred to Wilmington Savings and Trust Company. The initial plan was for the house to be demolished and the property turned into a gas station. Trying to save the structure, New York businessman Samuel Pryor planned to purchase the home, dismantle it, and relocate it to Connecticut. Upon learning this, North Carolina Society of Colonial Dames began a movement to preserve the colonial landmark by collecting money to purchase the property. When Mr. Pryor heard of their efforts, he had a change of heart. Abandoning his own plans, he contributed $250 to the North Carolina Society and speaks with bank officials on their behalf. In 1937 the state society purchased the Burgwin-Wright House for $21,000 and restoration efforts began soon after.

Work restoring the exterior of the house began in early 1939 and were completed by the end of 1941. At the last North Carolina Society board meeting of 1941, the members were looking forward to restoring the interior the following year. Four days later, Pearl Harbor was bombed and all energy and funds were directed towards the war effort. In 1943 the City of Wilmington leased the house from the society as a Recreational Center for Commissioned Officers. The "Lord Cornwallis Lounge" was opened in February 1944. The house continued to serve as an officers club and was returned to the society in April 1946.

Lead architect Erling H. Pedersen begins restoring the interior the house in 1949 after the North Carolina Society was able to raise all necessary funds. It is at this time that the house's plumbing and electrical work is installed throughout the house and the interior is completely restored with original paint colors. By the end of 1949 the house is ready to be furnished. Sam Hughes of MacMillan of New York was commissioned to create a furnishing plan and Henry Jay MacMillan was hired to purchase furniture from England. On March 30, 1951, the Burgwin-Wright House opens its doors to the public as a museum.

In 2018, a massive restoration project was completed inside the house. The floors were cleaned and refinished to highlight the natural beauty of the original Long-Leaf Pine planks. The walls were evaluated and repainted to reflect the original 1770 colors chosen by John Burgwin. In September of that year, Hurricane Florence devastated the North Carolina coast and extensive damage occurred to the roof and chimneys. In late 2019 and early 2020 the roof was completely restored in the eighteenth century cedar shake style.

== Public access ==
Today the Burgwin-Wright House is operated as a house museum. Visitors can tour the house with a guide Monday through Saturday from 10 am until 4 pm, with the last tour departing at 3 pm. The property can be rented for private functions including weddings, showers, business luncheons, and lectures. The gardens can also be rented for bridal portraits. Please contact the museum for more information and any questions.
