= National Society of the Colonial Dames of America =

Association of historic preservation societies

Colonial Dames of America
- The National Society of The Colonial Dames of America
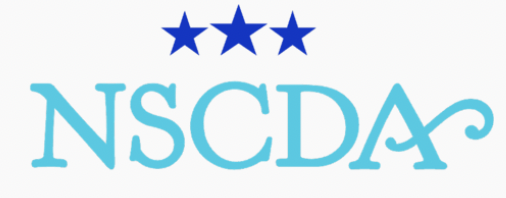

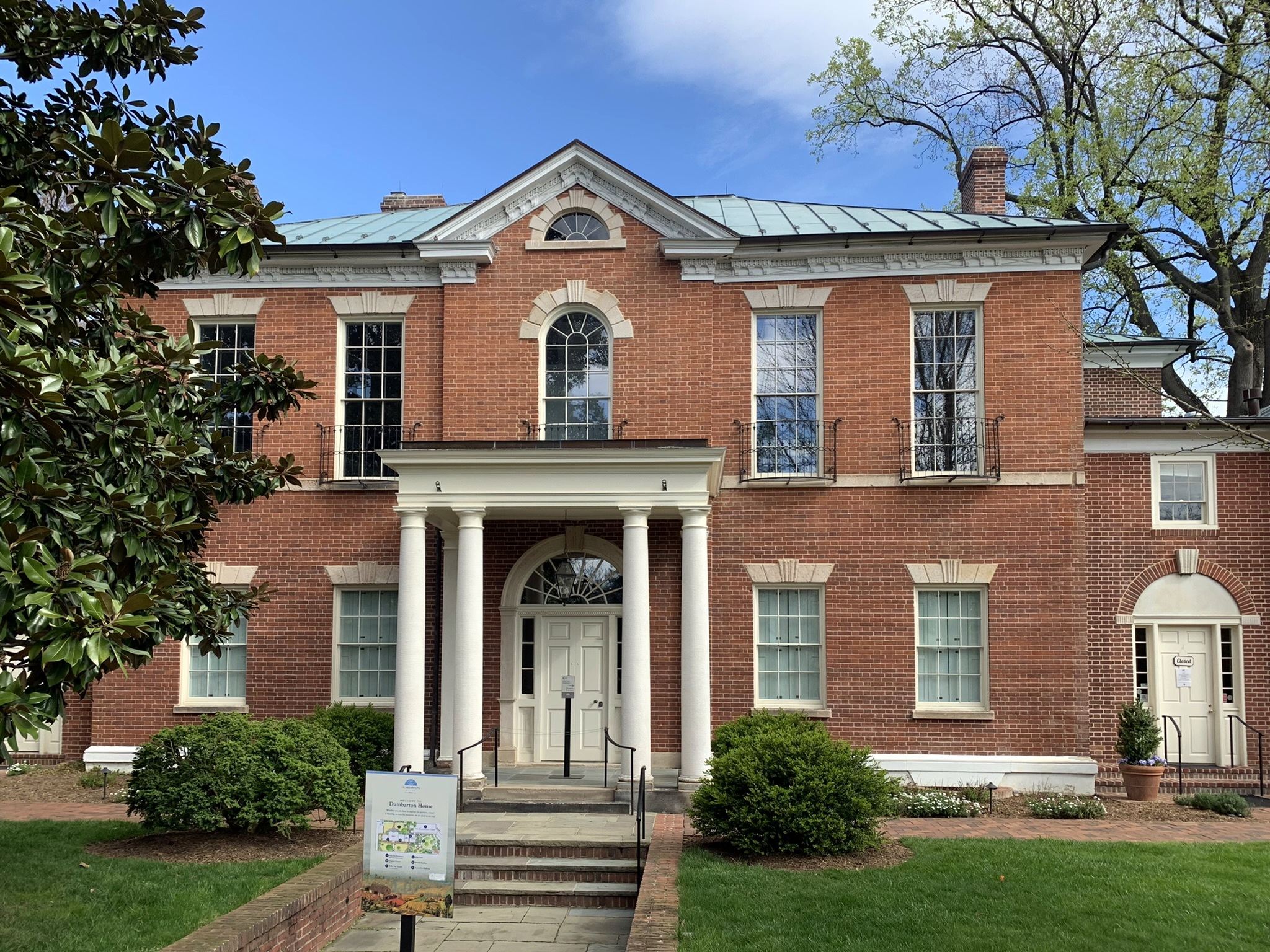
- Dumbarton House is the Society's Headquarters in Georgetown, Washington, D.C.
- Abbreviation: NSCDA
- Founded: April 8, 1891
- Type: Non-profit, lineage society
- Purpose: Historic preservation, education, patriotism
- Headquarters: Dumbarton House
- Members: 15,000
- Publication: Great American Treasures: Women Preserving History Since 1891
- Website: nscda.org

The National Society of The Colonial Dames of America (often abbreviated as NSCDA) is an American lineage society composed of women who are descended from an ancestor "who came to reside in an American Colony before 1776, and whose services were rendered during the Colonial Period." The organization has 43 local societies. The national headquarters is Dumbarton House in Georgetown, Washington, D.C.

== History ==
The organization was founded in 1891, shortly after the founding of a similar society, the Colonial Dames of America (CDA), which was created to have a centrally organized structure under the control of the parent Society in New York City.

The NSCDA was intended as a federation of State Societies in which each unit had a degree of autonomy. Another society formed around the same time was the Daughters of the American Revolution. Organized following the United States Centennial of 1876 and a Centennial of the US Constitution in New York in 1889, the NSCDA has worked in historic preservation, restoration and the interpretation of historic sites since its New York Society first undertook the preservation of the Van Cortlandt House in 1897.

The organization includes 43 corporate societies. Its headquarters is located at Dumbarton House, in Washington, D.C. In addition to its activities in museum work, the Society sponsors scholarship programs and other historic preservation, patriotic service and educational projects. Historic house museums owned or operated by the NSCDA include:

- Andrew Low House, Savannah, Georgia
- Burgwin-Wright House, Wilmington, North Carolina
- Henry B. Clarke House, Chicago, Illinois
- Dumbarton House, Washington, DC, the Society's national headquarters
- Governor Stephen Hopkins House, Providence, Rhode Island
- Gunston Hall, Mason Neck, Virginia
- Haywood Hall, Raleigh, North Carolina
- Old Indian Agency House, Portage, Wisconsin
- Hoover-Minthorn House, Newberg, Oregon
- Liberty Hall, Frankfort, Kentucky
- McElroy Octagon House, San Francisco, California
- Plum Grove Historic House, Iowa City, Iowa
- Stenton, Philadelphia, Pennsylvania
- Ximenez-Fatio House, St. Augustine, Florida
- Mount Clare, Baltimore, Maryland
- McAllister House Museum, Colorado Springs, Colorado
- Webb-Deane-Stevens Museum, Wethersfield, Connecticut
- Hotel de Paris Museum, Georgetown, Colorado
- Joel Lane Museum House, Raleigh, North Carolina
- Old First Presbyterian Church of Wilmington, Wilmington, Delaware
- Tate House, Portland, Maine
- Moffat-Ladd House, Portsmouth, New Hampshire
- Whitehall Museum House, Middletown, Rhode Island
- William Hickling Prescott House, Boston, Massachusetts
- Wilton House Museum, Richmond, Virginia
- Peachfield, Westampton, New Jersey

== Notable members ==
- Helen Gilman Noyes Brown (1867–1942), philanthropist
- Carol Cadou, museum curator and administrator, former executive director of the society from 2021 - 2024
- Ruth Coltrane Cannon (1891–1965), preservationist, historian, and philanthropist
- Sarah Johnson Cocke (1865–1944), writer and civic leader
- Alice Creelman (1858–1952), artist and art dealer
- Mary Mayo Crenshaw (1875–1951), author
- Ella Loraine Dorsey (1853–1935), author, journalist, and translator
- Marion Moncure Duncan (1913–1978), businesswoman and lineage society leader
- Elizabeth Gillie (1911–2009), politician
- Nellie Kinzie Gordon (1835–1917), writer and first president of the society
- Grace Gemberling (1903–1997), painter
- Anne Lyon Haight (1891–1977), author, essayist, and collector
- Mary Hilliard Hinton (1869–1961), painter, historian, and anti-suffragist
- Willie Kavanaugh Hocker (1862–1944), schoolteacher and designer of the Flag of Arkansas
- Ida Sherman Jenne (1860–1934), President National of the U.S. Daughters of 1812
- Jane Tunstall Lingo (1924–2007), journalist and socialite
- Anne Hazen McFarland (1868–1930), physician and medical journal editor
- Florence MacKubin (1857–1918), portrait painter
- Mary Martha Presley Merritt (died 1994), politician
- Mary Lane Morrison (1907–1994), writer, historian and preservationist
- Theodora Agnes Peck (1882–1964), author and poet
- Isabel Weld Perkins (1876–1948), heiress, author, and society hostess
- Delia Lyman Porter (1858–1933), author, social reformer, and clubwoman
- Sara Agnes Rice Pryor (1830–1912), writer and community activist
- Sarah Corbin Robert (1886–1972), authority on parliamentary procedure
- Eron Rowland (1861/2–1951), historian and author
- Marion Margery Scranton (1884–1960), women's suffrage activist
- Annie Bartlett Shepard (1861–1944), American anti-suffragist
- Sarah Logan Wister Starr (1873–1956), humanitarian
- Lilian Carpenter Streeter (1854–1935), social reformer and author
- Mary Oates Spratt Van Landingham (1852–1937), Vice President of the North Carolina Society of the Colonial Dames
- Presley Merritt Wagoner, 40th President General of the DAR
- Eva Ingersoll Wakefield (1892–1970), writer and poet
- Margaret Anderson Watts (1832–1905), social reformer
- May Rogers Webster (1873–1938), naturalist
- Anne Hollingsworth Wharton (1845–1928), writer and historian
- Helen M. Winslow (1851–1938), editor, author, publisher, and journalist
- Anna Wolcott (1868–1928), educator
- Frances Fisher Wood (1852–1938), educator, lecturer, and scientist
- Mary van Kleeck (1883–1972), social scientist and feminist

== See also ==
- Sons of the American Revolution (SAR)
- Children of the American Revolution (C.A.R.)
- The Mayflower Society
- Society of the Cincinnati
- Southern Dames of America
