= Dumbarton House =

Historic house in Washington, D.C., United States

- U.S. National Register of Historic Places
- D.C. Inventory of Historic Sites
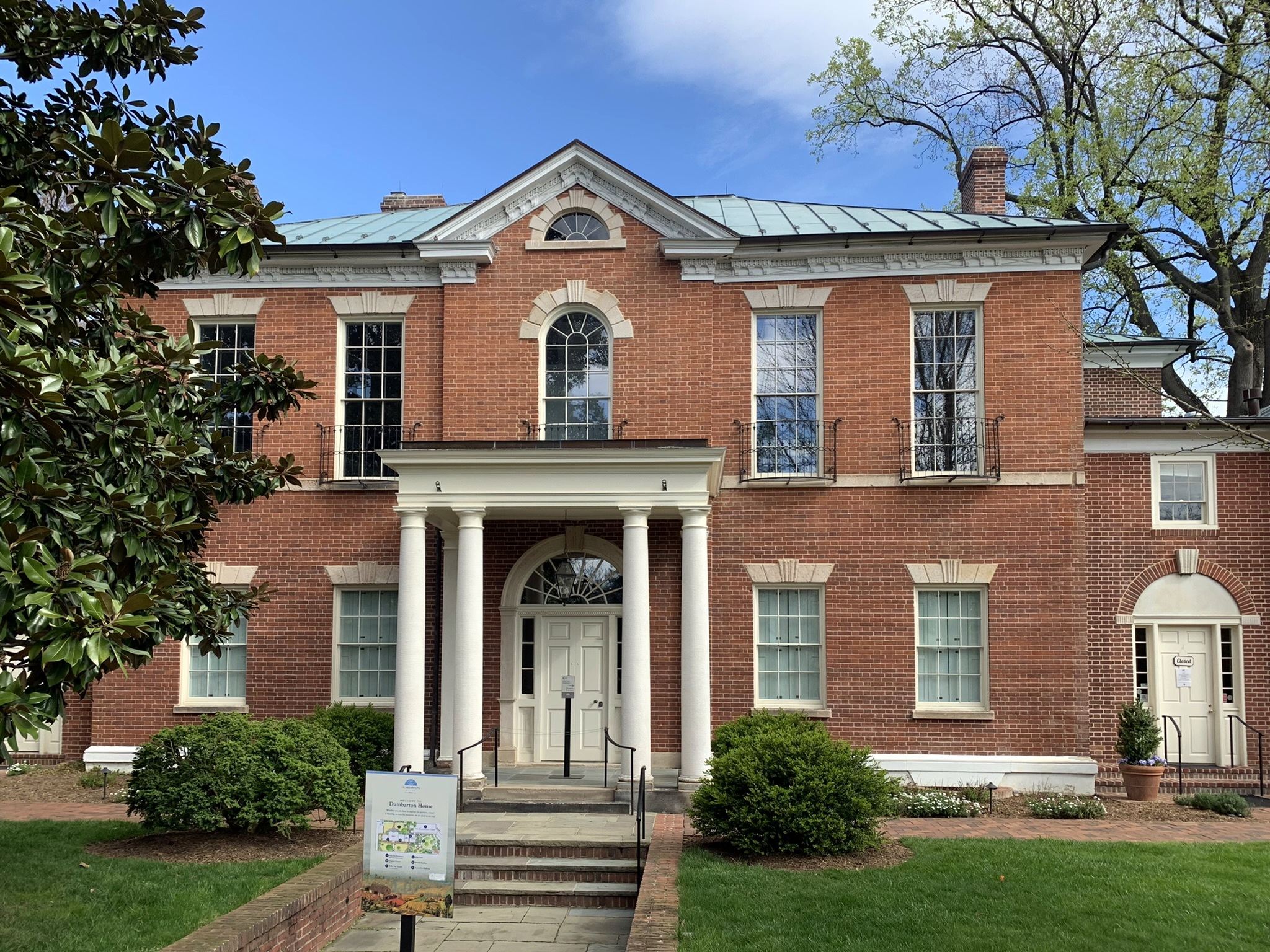
- Dumbarton House in 2022

- Location within Washington, D.C.
- Location: 2715 Q St., NW; Washington, D.C.
- Coordinates: 38°54′39″N 77°3′22″W
- Area: 0.6 acres (0.24 ha)
- Built: 1800
- Architect: Samuel Jackson
- Architectural style: Georgian, Federal, Adamesque
- NRHP reference No.: 90002148

Significant dates
- Added to NRHP: January 28, 1991
- Designated DCIHS: November 8, 1964

Dumbarton House is a Federal style house located in the Georgetown neighborhood of Washington, D.C. It was completed around 1800. Its first occupant was Joseph Nourse, the first Register of the Treasury. Dumbarton House, a federal period historic house museum, stands on approximately an acre of gardens on the northern edge of Georgetown, District of Columbia. The house is listed on the National Register of Historic Places. Displaying a fine collection of period decorative arts (furniture, silver, ceramics, etc.), it gives the visitor a concrete sense of a substantial private residence in the early 1800s. Constructed in 1798–99, the house was a private residence until The National Society of The Colonial Dames of America (NSCDA) purchased it for its headquarters in 1928 and gave it the name it has today. In addition to meeting its administrative needs, the NSCDA wanted to illustrate domestic life in Georgetown in the early federal period. To achieve this, its two principal floors were opened to the public as a house museum in 1932, on the 200th anniversary of the birth of George Washington. Both the house and the nearby Dumbarton Oaks take their names from an 18th-century estate which made up much of the area, which in turn had been named for the Scottish "Rock of Dumbarton."

== Construction ==
Dumbarton House was built by Samuel Jackson, a Philadelphia merchant, just before the Federal government moved from Philadelphia to the newly established national capital of Washington, a separate town in the District of Columbia. However, Jackson and his family lived there only briefly and the mortgage he had given, and then title to the property, soon passed to the United States. In 1804, the property was purchased at auction by Joseph Nourse, the first Register of the United States Treasury. An advertisement for the upcoming sale described the interior of the house in some detail: ". . . a large-two story brick house with a passage through the center, four rooms on a floor & good cellars. The front rooms are about 17 by 18 feet – the back rooms are semicircular and are about 22 by 17 feet – the passage is 9 feet wide and 38 feet long – two brick offices [wings] are two stories high 17 feet 6 inches square & are connected with the House by covered ways. . . ." In 1813, the Nourses sold the property to Charles Carroll of Belle Vue. (He was a cousin of Charles Carroll of Carrollton, signer of the Declaration of Independence.) The purchaser was also a friend of President James Madison and his wife Dolley. It is this “Mr. Carroll” to whom Dolley is referring in her famous letter describing the events of August 24, 1814, the day the British burned the "President's House" in the War of 1812. ". . . Our kind friend, Mr. Carroll, has come to hasten my departure, and is in very bad humor with me because I insist on waiting until the large picture of Gen. Washington is secured, and it requires to be unscrewed from the wall .... " When Dolley was finally satisfied that the Gilbert Stuart portrait of George Washington was safe, she came to Dumbarton House, as Mr. Carroll told her the President had requested, to await further word on where the couple should meet.

According to census records, between 1785 and 1840, both enslaved and "free colored males and females" worked at Dumbarton House. At least 10 to 13 enslaved or indentured people worked at the property. Some of them are known by name; an enslaved Black woman named Dinah; an enslaved Black man named Bacchus; a woman named Jane whose race is unknown; a cobbler named Juba; a "man servant" named Frank; and a woman named Fran who helped Dinah in the kitchen. Betsy, Polly, Will, and "Black Peter" are mentioned in passing.

== 20th century ==
Another dramatic event in the house's history occurred in 1915. By that time, Georgetown and Washington had been merged into a single political entity, although physically separated by Rock Creek. To facilitate traffic between the two communities, a new bridge was to be constructed, joining the segments of Q Street lying on opposite sides of Rock Creek and continuing Q Street to westward to Wisconsin Avenue. However, at that time, Dumbarton House was positioned approximately 50–60 feet to the south of its present location – right in the middle of Q Street. The owners had only two choices – move the house or demolish it. Since the center portion of the house had a full basement, it was jacked up, ". . . hoisted onto rollers, one animal, whether a horse or a mule has never been established, was attached to a windlass, and slowly it was hauled back . . ." and placed on a new foundation. "Its wings had no cellars so they were dismantled and then rebuilt."

In 1932 when Dumbarton House first opened, it was furnished with donated pieces dating generally to the revolutionary and federal periods (1790s through 1820), although occasionally earlier and sometimes later. The house is currently undergoing reinstallation and refurnishing to more accurately reflect the years of the Nourse residence (1804–13). In 2006, the Dumbarton House Board commissioned an in-depth study of the Nourses' furnishings and decorative style. Information was drawn from Nourse family correspondence and Joseph Nourse's account books. Gaps in the picture were filled with data from inventories of the same period and locale, newspapers advertisements, and paintings and prints. The results of the study, properly called a Historic Furnishings Plan, are in the process of being implemented.

In the 1950s, the Belin family, owners of the neighboring estate, Evermay, gave the NSCDA the property lying directly to the east and adjacent to Dumbarton House. Subsequently, noted Virginia landscape architect M. Meade Palmer designed the East Garden, and in 2010, Georgetown landscape architect Guy Williams of DCA Landscape Architects, Inc., created and supervised the installation of an herb garden within the East Garden. Today, Dumbarton House offers both guided and self-guided tours, as well as concerts, lectures, special exhibitions, and other cultural events. It also has a large ballroom opening onto a walled terrace, providing a site that can be rented for weddings or other events.

== See also ==
- List of the oldest buildings in Washington, D.C.

== External links and sources ==
- "Public Events and Private Events".
