= Fairfax Hall =

- U.S. National Register of Historic Places
- Virginia Landmarks Register
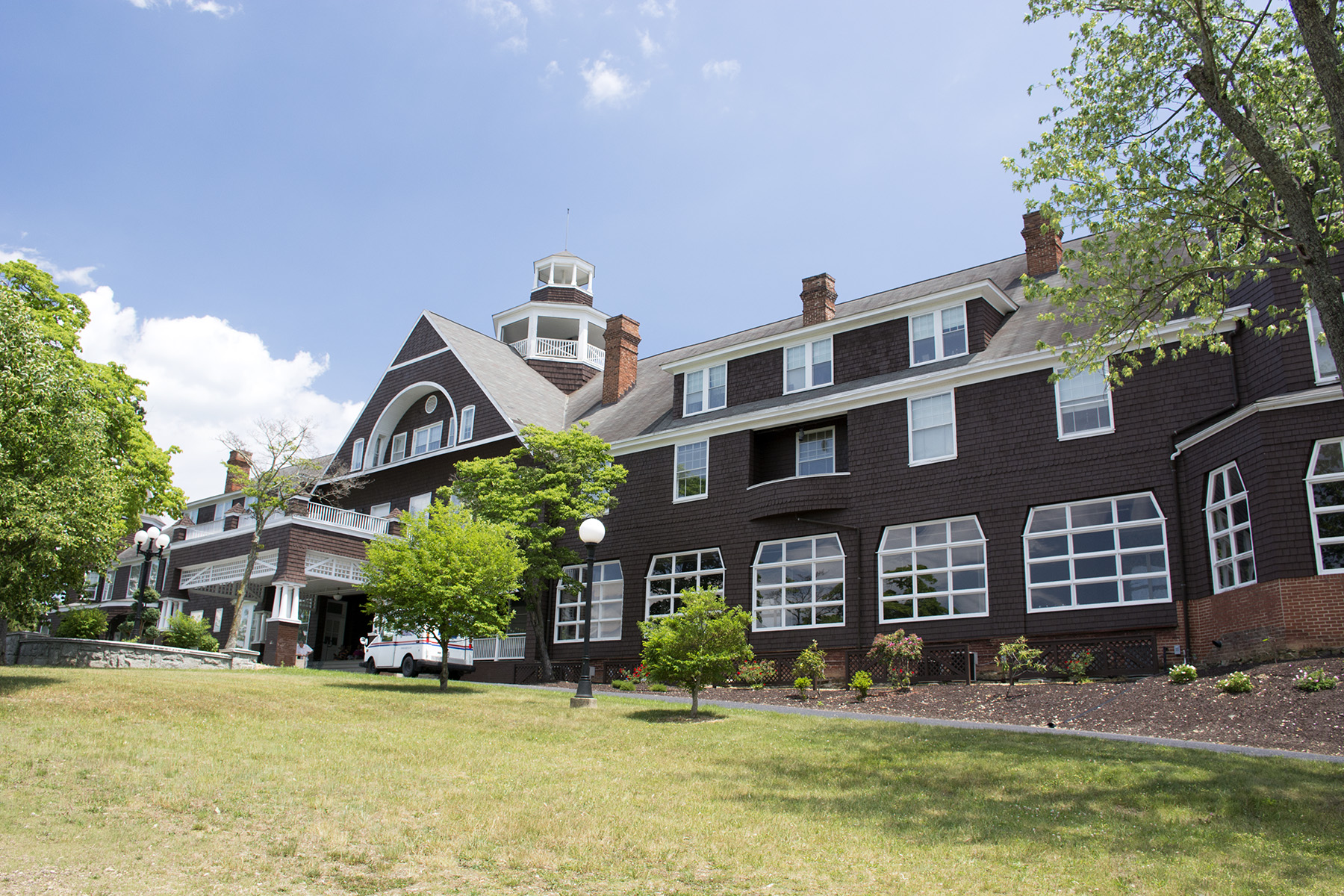

- Location within Virginia Location within the United States
- Location: Winchester Ave., Waynesboro, Virginia
- Coordinates: 38°4′13″N 78°52′14″W
- Area: 20 acres (8.1 ha)
- Built: 1890, 1926
- Architect: Poindexter, William
- Architectural style: Late 19th And 20th Century Revivals, Queen Anne, European Renaissance
- NRHP reference No.: 82004609
- VLR No.: 136-0010

Significant dates
- Added to NRHP: September 9, 1982
- Designated VLR: July 20, 1982

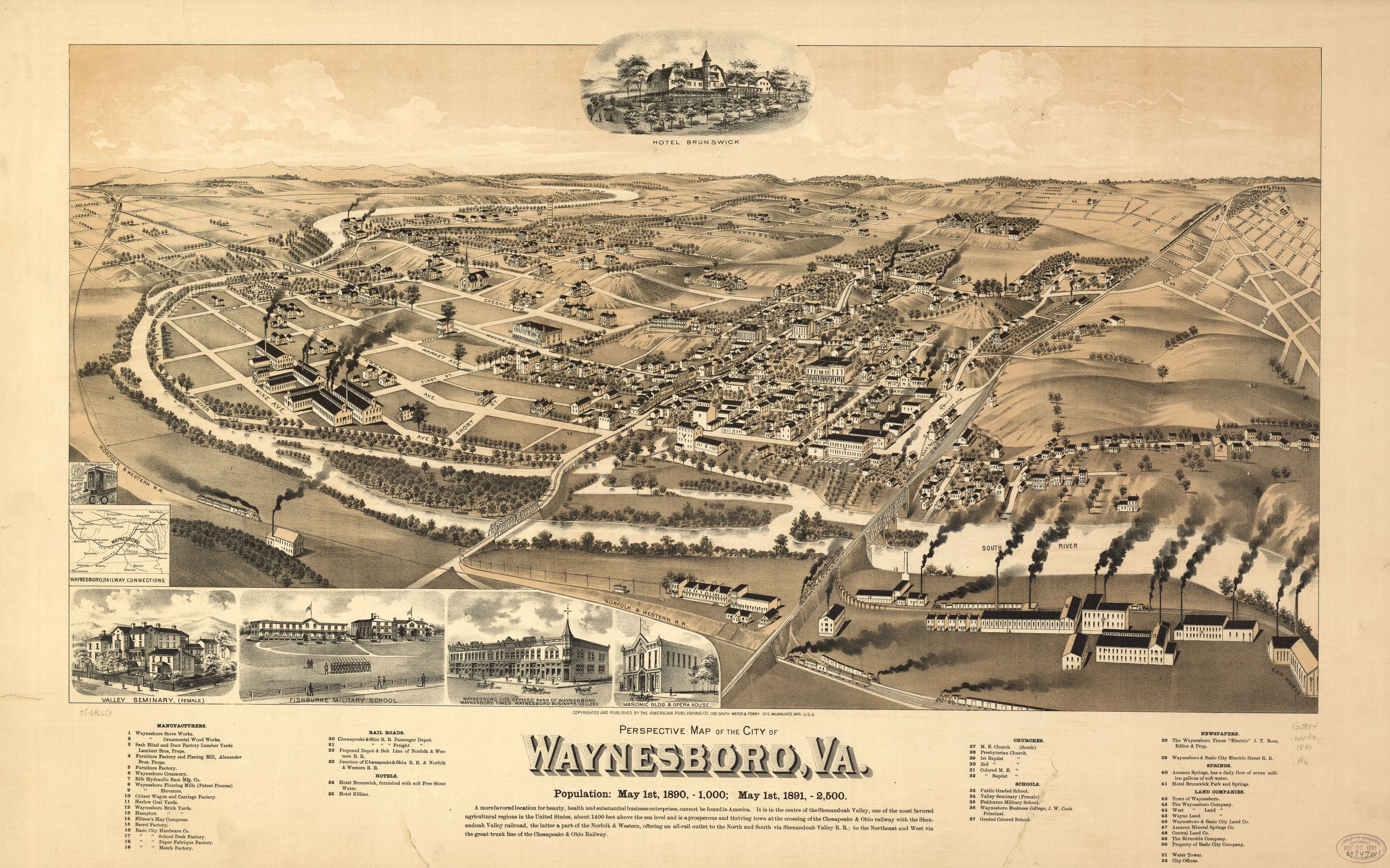
1891 map of Waynesboro looking westward with the "Iron Cross" rail junction and Basic City area factories at the bottom and downtown toward the center. An inset image at the top shows the then-luxurious and new Hotel Brunswick, now called Fairfax Hall. The map caption says the population grew from 1,000 to 2,500 from 1890 to 1891.

Fairfax Hall, previously known as Brandon Hotel (1890-1913), Brandon Institute (1913-1920), and Fairfax Hall Junior College or Fairfax Hall School (Junior College program discontinued in 1956) (1920-1975), is a historic building located at Waynesboro, Virginia. It was built in 1890, and is a 2 1/2-story, very long and rambling resort hotel building in the shingled mode of the Queen Anne style. It has an irregular symmetry with towers at either end of the facade, a one-story porte cochere, a distinctive octagonal belvedere and cupola, and glassed in first story porches. Also on the property is a contributing gymnasium, built in 1926 in the European Renaissance style. It was originally occupied by the Brandon Hotel resort. The Brandon closed in 1913 but the building reopened as a school. In 1920 the school became Fairfax Hall, a junior college and preparatory school for girls. After the school closed in 1975, it was leased by the Virginia Department of Corrections as a training academy but then purchased and reopened as a retirement home.

It was listed on the National Register of Historic Places in 1982.

Former students of the college and preparatory school for girls include film star Martha Hyer, musician Nikki Hornsby, politician Julia Brownley, and DAR President-General Presley Merritt Wagoner.
