= Mary Mayo Crenshaw =

American author (1875–1951)

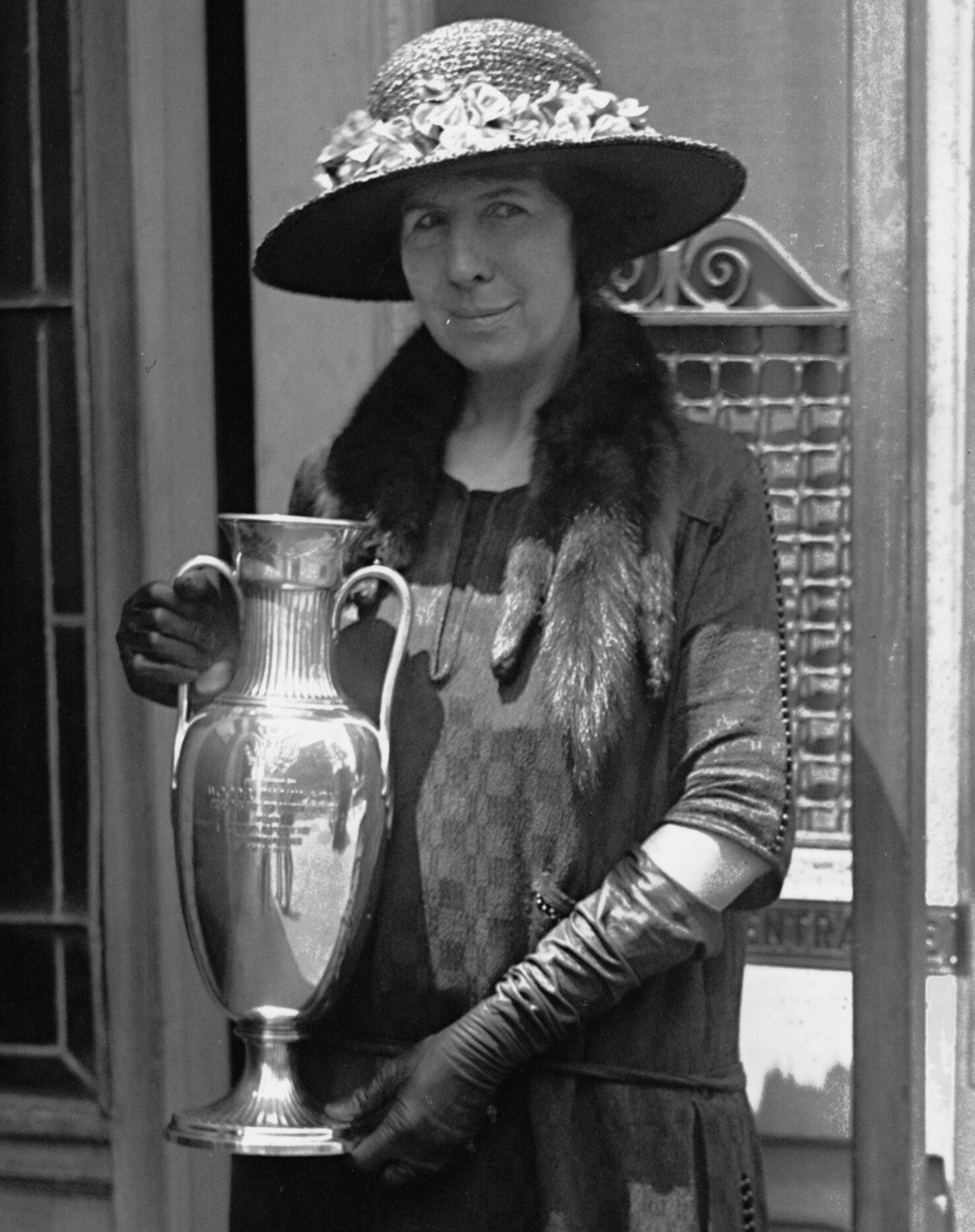
- Crenshaw in 1923
- Born: Mary Lyons Mayo; August 5, 1875; Richmond, Virginia, U.S.
- Died: November 6, 1951 (aged 76); Manhattan, New York, U.S.
- Resting place: Oak Hill Cemetery; Washington, D.C., U.S.
- Spouse: Richard Parker Crenshaw (m. 1902; died 1929)
- Children: 2
- Relatives: Henry Alexander Wise (great-grandfather)

Mary Lyons Mayo Crenshaw (August 5, 1875 - November 6, 1951) was an American author and civil servant who edited the book An American lady in Paris, a travel journal about her great-grandmother Abigail Dehart Mayo's journey to Paris in 1828.

== Life and work ==
Mary Lyons Mayo was born in 1875 to William Carrington Mayo and Margaretta Ellen Wise Mayo, the granddaughter of Virginia Governor Henry Alexander Wise. She lived in Washington D. C. She was married to Richard Parker Crenshaw, a mining engineer, on October 16, 1902, and the couple moved to Cuba in 1904 where he worked in the Camoa quarry. The family lived in Havana until returning to the United States in 1914. They had two children Richard Parker (1902) and Ellen Wise (1906). Upon their return to America, the Crenshaws worked at the Bureau of War Risk where Mary founded the translations section.

She was the member of many heritage societies including the Daughters of the Cincinnati, Daughters of Holland Dames, Colonial Lords of Manors in America, and the National Society of Colonial Dames. She was also one of the founders of the Daughters of the American Revolution's Havana Chapter in 1907.

Richard Crenshaw died in 1929. Mary Crenshaw died in 1951. She is buried with her husband in Oak Hill Cemetery in Washington, D.C.

== Writing ==
Prior to her marriage Crenshaw was known as a writer of magazine articles and an expert on historic Southern homes. She continued writing during and after her marriage. She wrote for St. Nicholas Magazine, Mentor Magazine, Arts & Decoration, Antiques, and Daughters of the American Revolution Magazine. In 1927 she published An American Lady in Paris, 1828-1829 Diary of Mrs. John Mayo which she edited. The book came out 99 years after her great-grandmother's travels and was published by Houghton-Mifflin. While the book's title says it is a diary, the notes are undated and the book itself is more of a travelogue. The Virginia Magazine of History and Biography said "Mrs. Crenshaw's editing is very well done."
