= Mary Martha Presley Merritt =

American politician (died 1994)

West Virginia Workers Compensation Commissioner
- In office 1985–1987

President of the West Virginia Board of Education
- In office 1975–1979

Member of the West Virginia House of Delegates
- In office 1970–1974

Personal details
- Born: Tutwiler, Mississippi, U.S.
- Died: May 15, 1994 Beckley, West Virginia, U.S.
- Resting place: Oakride Cemetery; Clarksdale, Mississippi, U.S.
- Party: Democratic
- Spouse: Charles W. Merritt
- Children: 3 (including Presley Merritt Wagoner)
- Education: University of Kentucky (BA)
- Occupation: politician

Mary Martha Presley Merritt (died May 15, 1994) was an American politician and civic leader. She served two terms in the West Virginia House of Delegates and was named West Virginia's Outstanding Woman Legislator by the Eagleton Institute of Politics in 1972. Merritt went on to serve as vice president and president of the West Virginia Board of Education and as the Worker's Compensation Commissioner.

== Early life and education ==
Merritt was born Mary Martha Presley in Tutwiler, Mississippi. She was the daughter of Curtis Edward Presley and Martha Ella Johnston Presley.

She was educated at National Park College and at the Cincinnati Conservatory of Music. Merritt earned a Bachelor of Arts degree in sociology from the University of Kentucky, where she was also inducted into Omicron Delta Kappa honor society and was a member of Delta Delta Delta sorority.

== Politics and public life ==
Merritt was elected to the West Virginia House of Delegates in 1970. She was reelected in 1972. She was named "West Virginia's Outstanding Woman Legislator" by the Eagleton Institute of Politics of Rutgers University in 1972. That same year, she was appointed by Governor Arch A. Moore Jr. to serve on the Regional Education Board Conference in New Orleans.

Merritt was appointed to the West Virginia Board of Education in 1975 and served until 1979, at times holding the office of vice president and president.

She served as the Workers Compensation Commissioner from 1985 to 1987.

== Personal life ==
In 1947, she married Charles W. Merritt, an obstetrician and gynecologist. They had three children: Presley, Ann, and Charles.

Merritt was a parishioner at St. Stephen's Episcopal Church in Beckley, West Virginia and served as the organist and choir director for thirteen years. She was also an avid genealogist and was a member of multiple lineage societies. She served as the Regent of the Captain James Allen Chapter of the Daughters of the American Revolution and as West Virginia State President of the National Society of the Colonial Dames of America. She was also a member of the Jamestowne Society.

She died of cancer on May 15, 1994, in Beckley. Her funeral was held at St. Stephen's Episcopal Church on May 18, 1994. A burial service was held at Oakridge Cemetery in Clarksdale, Mississippi on May 20, 1994.
