= List of the oldest buildings in Washington, D.C. =

This article lists the oldest extant buildings in Washington, D.C., including extant buildings and structures constructed prior to and during the United States rule over Washington, D.C. Only buildings built prior to 1820 are suitable for inclusion on this list, or the building must be the oldest of its type.

In order to qualify for the list, a structure must:

- be a recognizable building (defined as any human-made structure used or intended for supporting or sheltering any use or continuous occupancy);
- incorporate features of building work from the claimed date to at least 1.5 metres (4.9 ft) in height and/or be a listed building.

This consciously excludes ruins of limited height, roads and statues. Bridges may be included if they otherwise fulfill the above criteria. Dates for many of the oldest structures have been arrived at by radiocarbon dating or dendrochronology and should be considered approximate. If the exact year of initial construction is estimated, it will be shown as a range of dates.

== List of oldest buildings ==
| Building | Image | Location | First built | Use | Notes |
|---|---|---|---|---|---|
| Old Stone House (Washington, D.C.) | | 3051 M St NW | 1765 | House | Oldest surviving building built in Washington, D.C. |
| The White House | | 1600 Pennsylvania Avenue | 1792 | Government | U.S. President's Executive Mansion; Was largely rebuilt after War of 1812, except for exterior walls which are original. |
| United States Capitol | | First St SE | 1793 | Government | U.S. Senate and U.S. House of Representatives chambers. Was largely rebuilt after War of 1812, except for walls which are original. |
| Dumbarton House | | 2715 Q St NW 20007 | 1799 | House | Originally home to Joseph Nourse, the first Register of the US Treasury; Now National Headquarters of the NSCDA. |
| Sewall-Belmont House | | 144 Constitution Ave NE 20002 | 1800 | House | Former headquarters of National Women's Party. Now known as Belmont-Paul Women's Equality National Monument |
| The Octagon House | | 1799 New York Ave NW | 1801 | Residence | Served temporarily as U.S. President's Executive Mansion while White House was being rebuilt after the War of 1812. |

== See also ==
- National Register of Historic Places listings in Washington, D.C.
- History of Washington, D.C.
- Oldest buildings in the United States
