= Mary Oates Spratt Van Landingham =

American civic leader and writer

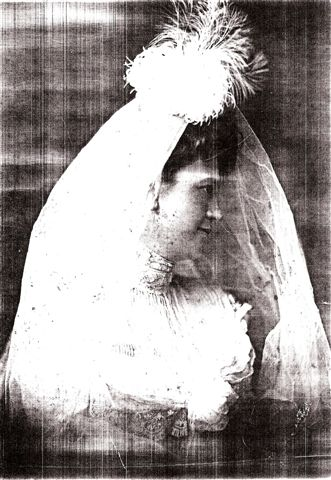
- Van Landingham on her wedding day in 1873

Vice President General, National Society Daughters of the American Revolution
- In office 1913–1914
- President: Daisy Allen Story

State Regent, North Carolina Society Daughters of the American Revolution
- In office 1907–1910

Vice President, North Carolina Society of the Colonial Dames of America

Personal details
- Born: Mary Oates Spratt; September 14, 1852 Charlotte, North Carolina, U.S.
- Died: December 24, 1937 (aged 85) Charlotte, North Carolina, U.S.
- Resting place: Elmwood Cemetery
- Spouse: John Van Landingham
- Children: 4
- Occupation: historian, writer

Mary Oates Spratt Van Landingham (September 14, 1852 – December 24, 1937) was an American civic leader, writer, and historian. She was a prominent figure in the Daughters of the American Revolution, serving as North Carolina's state regent from 1907 to 1910 and as a Vice President General of the national society from 1913 to 1914. She also served as vice president of the North Carolina branch of the National Society of the Colonial Dames of America. She wrote historical and literary pieces for local newspapers and, in 1922, she published a collection of her works under the title Glowing Embers.

== Early life ==
Van Landingham was born Mary Oates Spratt on September 14, 1852 in Charlotte, North Carolina to Charles Elms Spratt and Margaret Lowery Oates Spratt. She was a descendant of multiple colonial and Revolutionary ancestors. She was raised in the Episcopal Church.

== Civic and society activities ==
Van Landingham was a charter member of the Mecklenburg Chapter of the Daughters of the American Revolution. She held multiple offices within her chapter. She served as the state society's state regent on three occasions, and served as a vice president of the national society from 1913 to 1914. She declined to be a candidate for DAR President General on three occasions.

She was also an active member of the National Society of the Colonial Dames of America and served as the state society's vice president.

On March 6, 1900, Van Landingham became the first woman to give an address to the Mecklenburg Historical Society, comparing the literary production of the state with that of Virginia and South Carolina during her speech "The Native Literature of North Carolina." That same year, she became the first woman to address the North Carolina Literary and Historical Association when she presented her paper The Encouragement of Art as an Aid to History and Literature. She was an avid historical writer, often writing pieces for local newspapers, literary societies, book clubs, and church organizations. In 1922 she published a selection of her writings under the title Glowing Embers.

She was a member of the North Carolina Folklore Society, attending meetings in Raleigh.

Van Landingham was an active member of the Episcopal Church, holding multiple offices at her parish and in the Episcopal Diocese of Western North Carolina, and raised funds for St. Peter's Hospital.

== Personal life ==
On December 18, 1873, she married the hardware merchant John Van Landingham. They had four children. The family lived at 500 East Avenue in Charlotte.

Van Landingham died on December 24 1937, two weeks after suffering a stroke. Her funeral was held at St. Peter's Episcopal Church and she was buried in Charlotte's Elmwood Cemetery.
