= Elizabeth Gillie =

American politician (1911–2009)

- Gillie c. 1947

Member of the Connecticut House of Representatives from New Haven
- In office 1947–1949 Serving with Irving Horowitz
- Preceded by: Anthony Avallone; Charles Henchel
- Succeeded by: Alfred A. Toscano; Charles Henchel

Personal details
- Born: Elizabeth Berrien; October 2, 1911 New Haven, Connecticut, U.S.
- Died: March 16, 2009 (aged 97) Manchester, Connecticut, U.S.
- Party: Republican
- Spouse(s): James Ross Gillie (m. 1939; died 1942) Harry Hager Lugg (m. 1947; died 1965)

Elizabeth Lugg (October 2, 1911 – March 16, 2009), better known as Elizabeth Gillie, was an American politician who served in the Connecticut House of Representatives from 1947 to 1949, representing the city of New Haven as a Republican.

== Personal life ==
Elizabeth Berrien was born on October 2, 1911, in New Haven, Connecticut, to Frank F. and Elizabeth Berrien. She was a graduate of Bennett College and married her first husband, James Ross Gillie, in 1939. James served in World War II and was killed in action in 1942. Following his death, Elizabeth took a drafting course at Yale University, and she worked at war plants until the end of World War II. She married her second husband, Harry Hager Lugg, also a state representative, in December 1947. He died in 1965 of multiple sclerosis.

Gillie belonged to the National Society of the Colonial Dames of America, a lineage society for women with an ancestor who came to the Thirteen Colonies before 1776.

== Political career ==
A Republican, Gillie was elected to the Connecticut House of Representatives in 1946, and she served one term representing the city of New Haven alongside fellow Republican Irving Horowitz. She did not run for reelection in 1948.

Gillie served on the New Haven Board of Education.

== Death ==
Gillie died on March 16, 2009, in Manchester, Connecticut. She was 97.
