= Presley Merritt Wagoner =

46th President General of the Daughters of the American Revolution

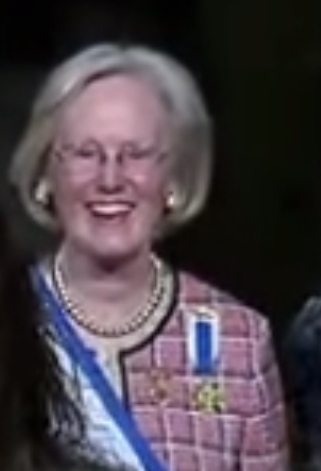
- Wagoner in 2024

40th President General of the National Society Daughters of the American Revolution
- In office 2004–2007
- Preceded by: Linda Tinker Watkins
- Succeeded by: Linda Gist Calvin

Personal details
- Born: Presley McDonald Merritt
- Spouse: Joel Morris Wagoner
- Parent(s): Charles W. Merritt; Mary Martha Presley
- Education: Brenau College

Presley McDonald Merritt Wagoner is an American clubwoman who served as the President General of the Daughters of the American Revolution from 2005 to 2007.

== Biography ==
Wagoner is the daughter of Charles W. Merrit, an obstetrician and gynecologist, and Mary Martha Presley Merritt, a Democrat politician who served in the West Virginia House of Delegates and as the president of the West Virginia Board of Education.

She was educated at Fairfax Hall, a preparatory school for girls in Waynesboro, Virginia, and graduated magna cum laude from Brenau College, where she was a member of Delta Delta Delta, in 1971.

== Career ==
In 1972, she worked as the assistant director of admissions at Brenau College.

In 1972, she joined the Captain James Allen Chapter of the Daughters of the American Revolution as a junior member. She was the West Virginia Outstanding Junior Member in 1982 and served as a personal page to DAR President General Patricia Walton Shelby. Merritt later served as West Virginia State Regent, Organizing Secretary General, and Chaplain General of the DAR. In 2004, she was elected as the fortieth President General of the National Society Daughters of the American Revolution. On June 30, 2006, she presented U.S. Marine Corps General Peter Pace with the Patriot Award during a ceremony at DAR Constitution Hall. That same year, Merritt dedicated a historical marker in the gardens of the Casa de América in Madrid that commemorated Spain's aid in the American Revolutionary War.

Merritt is a member of the Hereditary Society Community of the United States of America, the National Gavel Society, the National Society of the Colonial Dames of America, the Jamestowne Society, the Plantagenet Society, the Colonial Order of the Crown, the Sovereign Colonial Society Americans of Royal Descent, and the National Society Magna Charta Dames.

== Personal life ==
She married Joel Morris Wagoner, a dentist from Liberty, North Carolina, at St. Stephen's Episcopal Church in Beckley, West Virginia.
