= Hurricane Estelle (1986) =

Category 4 Pacific hurricane in 1986

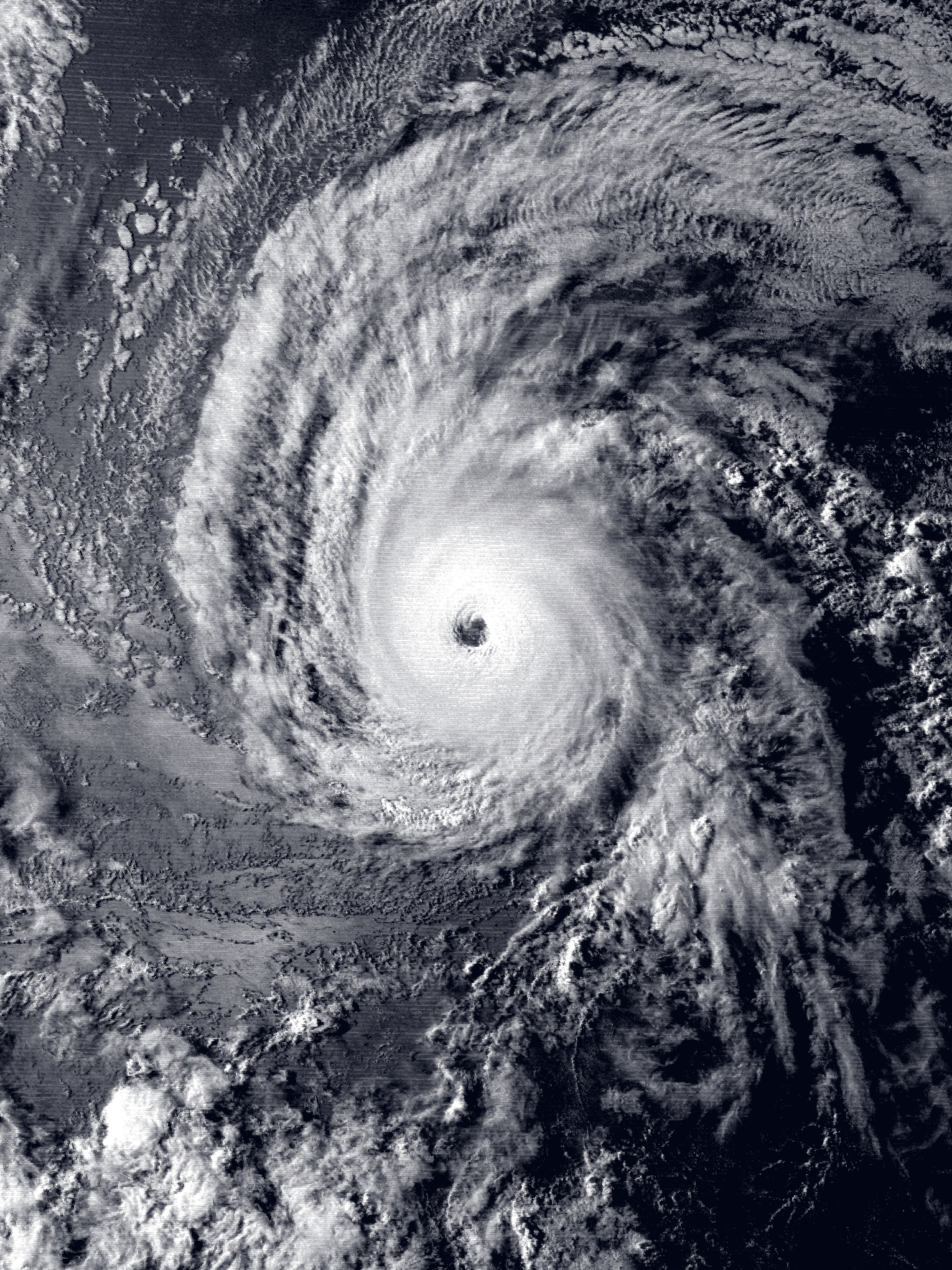
- Estelle as a Category 4 hurricane on July 21

Meteorological history
- Formed: July 16, 1986
- Dissipated: July 26, 1986

Category 4 major hurricane
- 1-minute sustained (SSHWS/NWS)
- Highest winds: 130 mph (215 km/h)

Overall effects
- Fatalities: 2 total
- Damage: $2 million (1986 USD)
- Areas affected: Hawaii
- IBTrACS
- Part of the 1986 Pacific hurricane season

Hurricane Estelle was a powerful tropical cyclone that caused minor damage and two deaths in Hawaii in July 1986. Estelle was the sixth tropical cyclone, fifth named storm, third hurricane, and first major hurricane of the above-average 1986 Pacific hurricane season. It formed as a tropical depression formed well southwest of the Baja California Peninsula on July 16, and strengthened into a tropical storm within 24 hours. Located within a favorable environment, Estelle intensified into a hurricane on July 18. It attained major hurricane status (Category 3 intensity or higher on the Saffir-Simpson Hurricane Scale) two days later. After peaking in intensity at Category 4 strength, Estelle slowly weakened. By July 24, Estelle was no longer a hurricane while passing south of Hawaii. It completely dissipated on July 26 after further deteriorating to a tropical depression. The arrival of the hurricane prompted a hurricane watch for Hawaii, and 200 people evacuated from their homes. Hurricane Estelle produced high waves offshore Hawaii, causing $2 million in damage and two deaths. The remnants of the storm also produced intermittent showers across the state, though there was no major damage.

== Meteorological history ==
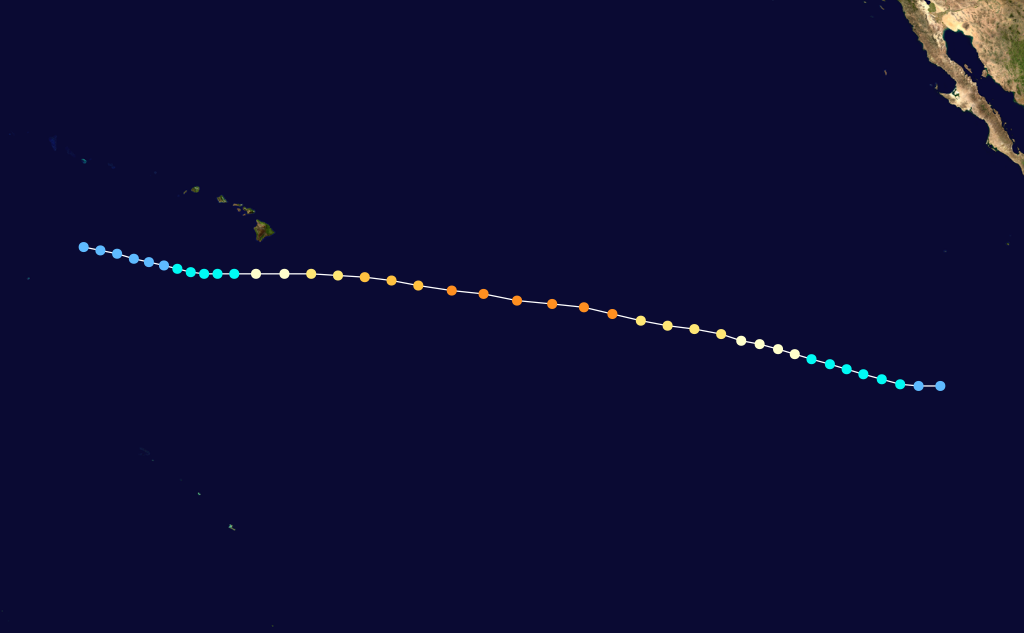
Map plotting the storm's track and intensity, according to the Saffir–Simpson scale Map key Saffir–Simpson scale Tropical depression (≤38 mph, ≤62 km/h) Tropical storm (39–73 mph, 63–118 km/h) Category 1 (74–95 mph, 119–153 km/h) Category 2 (96–110 mph, 154–177 km/h) Category 3 (111–129 mph, 178–208 km/h) Category 4 (130–156 mph, 209–251 km/h) Category 5 (≥157 mph, ≥252 km/h) Unknown Storm type Tropical cyclone Subtropical cyclone Extratropical cyclone, remnant low, tropical disturbance, or monsoon depression

Based on data from satellite imagery and weather reports from the cargo ships Hamburg Express and Aleksander Vermishev, the Eastern Pacific Hurricane Center (EPHC) upgraded a tropical disturbance into a tropical depression. At this time, the depression was located 390 mi (630 km) west of Clipperton Island, a small remote island in the Pacific Ocean, at 1200 UTC July 16. Moving towards the west beneath a high pressure area, the depression intensified into Tropical Storm Estelle 12 hours after formation. Upon being named sea surface temperatures along the storm's path were 84 °F (29 °C), and thus Estelle began to rapidly intensify. The EPHC reported that Estelle had intensified a Category 1 hurricane on the Saffir-Simpson Hurricane Scale on 1200 UTC July 17, 24 hours after first forming.

Shortly after attaining hurricane intensity, an eye began to appear on weather satellite imagery. Based on this, the EPHC re-assessed the intensity of the system at 85 mph (135 km/h). Continuing to intensity, Hurricane Estelle became the first major hurricane of the 1986 Pacific hurricane season on 0000 UTC July 18. As its motion accelerated, Estelle peaked intensity at 135 mph (215 km/h). Moving west, Hurricane Estelle emerged into the Central Pacific Hurricane Center's area of responsibility while still a major hurricane. Shortly thereafter, Estelle's forward motion increased to close to 25 mph (40 km/h). As such, forecasters noted the path of a potential landfall on the Big Island. Due to a shearing environment from a trough, Estelle weakened as it continued to approach Hawaii. A possible re-curve towards the island never materialized, and the hurricane veered to west and passed south of the islands. Estelle weakened to a tropical storm on July 23 while passing south of Hawaii, and two days later it weakened to a depression. The tropical cyclone dissipated on July 27.

== Preparations, impact, and observation ==
On July 22, the National Weather Service issued a hurricane watch and high-surf advisory for the Island of Hawaii as the storm was anticipated to produce life-threatening waves throughout the island chain. Gale warnings and small craft advisories were also issued. Hurricane Estelle was described by meteorologists as "small but dangerous". More than 200 people evacuated from their homes near the shoreline, but others refused to leave. However, the hurricane watch was dropped on July 24 when Estelle weakened to a tropical storm.

Due to its rapid motion, Estelle kept pace with a large swell of water that it generated. In combination with a high spring tide and peripheral winds generated by Estelle, 15 ft (4.6 m) to 20 ft (6.1 m) waves crashed on the shores of the Big Island on the afternoon of July 22. Five homes were destroyed and another five sustained extreme damage. Twelve other homes received minor damage. Three beachfront divisions were destroyed. Dozens of other places in Vacation Land were also damaged. On Maui, waves washed away a dirt road on the eastern part of the island between Kipahulu and Kaupo. After Estelle passed by the islands, moisture related to the tropical cyclone caused heavy rainfall in the Ka'u and Puna districts on the Big Island. On July 22, a wind gust of 55 mph (89 km/h) was recorded near Kalapana Sand Beach. The total damage was around $2 million (1986 USD). Two drownings were reported on Oahu that occurred on July 23, due to rough surf caused by Estelle.

Although isolated showers were initially recorded in the southern portion of the state, after Hurricane Estelle dissipated, its moisture became entrapped in a trough over the islands, causing significant rainfall and thunderstorms over the archipelago. Some areas in Hawaii received 5 in (130 mm) to 10 in (250 mm). The rains in Hawaii had cleared up by July 29.

Estelle was a well-observed storm, with Reconnaissance Aircraft flying into the hurricane to provide a fix on its location. It also passed near NOAA Buoy 51004 on July 22, providing valuable meteorological data for its future path.

== See also ==
- List of Pacific hurricanes
- List of storms named Estelle
- List of Category 4 Pacific hurricanes
- Hurricane Iselle
