= List of storms named Estelle =

The name Estelle has been used for twelve tropical cyclones in the Eastern Pacific Ocean, making Estelle one of the most frequently used Pacific storm names.

- Hurricane Estelle (1960), Category 1 hurricane that affected the coast of Central America and Mexico.
- Tropical Storm Estelle (1968), long-lived tropical storm that dissipated before reaching the Central Pacific.
- Hurricane Estelle (1972), Category 1 hurricane that churned in the open ocean.
- Tropical Storm Estelle (1976), weak and short-lived tropical storm that stayed at sea.
- Tropical Storm Estelle (1980), weak and short-lived tropical storm that stayed at sea.
- Hurricane Estelle (1986), Category 4 hurricane that moved south of Hawaii.
- Hurricane Estelle (1992), Category 4 hurricane that formed far away from the coast.
- Hurricane Estelle (1998), Category 4 hurricane that did not affect land.
- Tropical Storm Estelle (2004), strong tropical storm that moved into the Central Pacific.
- Tropical Storm Estelle (2010), strong tropical storm that formed near Mexico but moved out to sea.
- Tropical Storm Estelle (2016), strong tropical storm that churned in the open ocean.
- Hurricane Estelle (2022), Category 1 hurricane that formed near Mexico but moved out to sea.

The name Estelle has also been used for one tropical cyclone in the Southwest Indian Ocean.

- Tropical Storm Estelle (1979) – a weak tropical storm moved around the Mascarene Islands, with a peak rainfall total on Réunion of 544 mm (21.4 in) recorded at Petite Plaine.
