= ARA Azopardo =

ARA Azopardo or Azopardo may refer to one the following vessels of the Argentine Navy, named after Juan Bautista Azopardo, an Argentine naval officer:

- ARA Azopardo (1884), 1885–1922, was a transport
- ARA Azopardo (1922), 1922–1943, was a tugboat
- ARA Azopardo (P-35), 1955–1972, was a frigate

Azopardo may also refer to one the following vessels of the Argentine Naval Prefecture, with same namesake:

- Juan B. Azopardo (GC 11), a former US Navy Asheville-class frigate transferred to Argentina
- PNA Azopardo (GC-25), a Mantilla-class patrol boat in service since 1983

== See also ==
- Azopardo (disambiguation page)
