= Azopardo =

Azopardo may refer to:

- Azopardo Airport, an airport located near Timaukel, Chile
- Azopardo River, a river in Isla Grande de Tierra del Fuego, Chile
- Juan Bautista Azopardo (1772–1848), Maltese privateer and officer of the Argentine Navy during the Independence and Cisplatine wars
- Azopardo, Buenos Aires, a town in Argentina
- Several ships of Argentina have been named either Azopardo or ARA Azopardo, among them:
  - ARA Azopardo (P-35), an anti-submarine frigate in service with the Argentine Navy from 1955 to 1972
  - PNA Azopardo (GC-25), a Mantilla-class patrol boat in service with the Argentine Naval Prefecture since 1983
