= Murature =

Murature may refer to:

- Murature-class patrol ship, class of World War II era Argentine Navy warships
- ARA Murature (P-20), World War II era Argentine Navy warship
- José Luis Murature (1876–1929), Argentine foreign minister
