= Puan =

Puan may refer to:

== Places ==
- Puan, Buenos Aires, a town in Buenos Aires Province, Argentina
- Puan Partido, a partido in Buenos Aires Province, Argentina
- Puan (Buenos Aires Metro), a metro station in Buenos Aires, Argentina
- Pu'an County, in Guizhou, China

== Other uses ==
- Puan (film), a 2023 Argentine comedy-drama film
- Puan (spider), a genus of goblin spiders from Argentina
- Puan Maharani (born 1973), Indonesian politician
- Puan, a Malay title
- Puan, a word for Mizo clothing
