= ARA Murature =

At least two ships of the Argentine Navy have been named Murature:

- ARA Murature (M-5), a minesweeper previously the German M-74 and renamed on transfer in 1922. She was decommissioned in 1938.
- ARA Murature (P-20), a Murature-class patrol boat launched in 1944 and decommissioned in 2014.
