= Azopardo-class frigate =

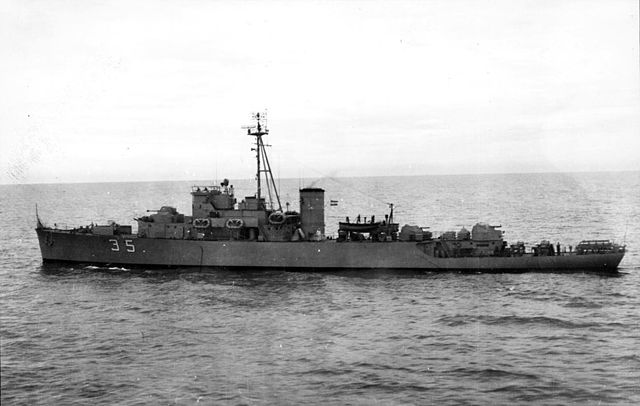
- ARA Azopardo, date unknown

Class overview
- Name: Azopardo class frigate
- Builders: AFNE Rio Santiago, Argentina
- Operators: Argentine Navy
- Built: 1950-1958
- In service: 1956-1972
- In commission: 1956–1972
- Planned: 2
- Completed: 2
- Retired: 2

General characteristics
- Type: Azopardo class frigate
- Displacement: 1220 (standard) to 1400 (full load) tons
- Length: 92.72 m (304.2 ft)
- Beam: 9.6 m (31.5 ft)
- Draft: 4 m (13 ft)
- Propulsion: 2-shaft, 2 × Parsons Steam turbines, 2 x Water-tube boilers, 5,000 ihp (3,700 kW), 340 tons oil
- Speed: 20 knots (23 mph; 37 km/h)
- Range: 2300 nautical miles @ ?kn
- Complement: 170
- Armament: 4 × 105-millimetre (4 in) L45 Bofors DP guns; 4 × 40 mm (1.6 in) Bofors AA guns; 4 × anti-submarine mortars
- Armour: none
- Notes: Specifications from “Conway's All the World's Fighting Ships 1947-1995” and “Histarmar” website.

The Azopardo-class frigates were a class of two post-World War II warships, designed and built in Argentina in 1940-1959, originally as part of a class of four large minelayers (see Murature-class ships). They were in service with the Argentine Navy from the mid-1950s to 1972. The class was named after Juan Bautista Azopardo, an Argentine naval officer in the Independence and Cisplatine wars.

== Design ==
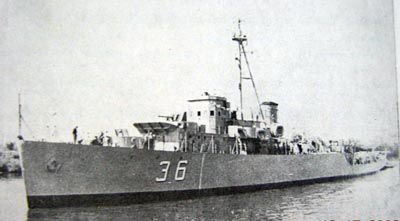
ARA Piedra Buena underway, date unknown.

The class was as part of a program to build four mine warfare ships during the Second World War, of which two (Murature and King) were completed as patrol ships in the 1940s and the others (Piedrabuena and Azopardo) as antisubmarine frigates in the 1950s.

The Azopardo class frigates had a metal hull with a single mast and funnel. They were powered by two Parsons steam turbines fed by two water-tube boilers, driving two propellers.

The main battery was composed of four 105-millimetre (4 in) Bofors DP guns, with a secondary battery of four 40-millimetre (2 in) Bofors Anti-Aircraft guns in single mountings. It also carried four anti-submarine mortars.

== Service history ==
The Azopardo class was designed in the early 1940s; however due to shortages during World War II the ships were laid down in the early 1950s and completed in 1956-58. They were commissioned by the Argentine Navy in 1956-59 and remained in service until the early 1970s.

Azopardo and Piedra Buena were incorporated in the High Seas Fleet ((in Spanish) Flota de Mar), and frequently used to patrol the Argentine Sea and in training exercises, including the multinational “UNITAS”.

Both ships were sold for scrap after being decommissioned in 1972, and were broken up in the 1970s..

== Ships in class ==
Construction data
Ship Name	Pennant Number	Other names	Builder	Laid down	Launched	Service entry	Decommissioning
ARA Azopardo	P-35	none	AFNE Rio Santiago	1940	1953	1956	1972 (Note: Sold for scrapping to AYASA in December 1972.)
ARA Piedra Buena	P-36	none	AFNE Rio Santiago		1954	1958	1972 (Note: Sold for scrapping to AYASA in December 1972.)

== See also ==
- List of ships of the Argentine Navy
- Murature-class patrol ship

Equivalent frigates of the same era

- Bergamini class
- Loch class
- Petya class
- Roofdier class
