= ARA King =

At least two ships of the Argentine Navy have been named King:

- ARA King (M-4), a minesweeper previously the German M-53 and renamed on transfer in 1922. She was decommissioned in 1937.
- ARA King (P-21), a Murature-class patrol boat launched in 1943.
