= ARA Piedra Buena =

At least four ships of the Argentine Navy have been named Piedra Buena or Piedrabuena :

- ARA Piedrabuena (1900), a steam corvette which was commissioned as the gunboat Paraná in 1874. She was renamed Piedrabuena in 1900 and re-rated as a transport. She was wrecked in 1926.
- ARA Piedra Buena (D-29), an Allen M. Sumner-class destroyer launched in 1944 as USS Collett acquired in 1974 and renamed on commissioning in 1977. She was expended as a target in 1988.
- ARA Piedra Buena (P-36), an Azopardo-class frigate launched in 1954 and scrapped in 1972.
- ARA Piedrabuena (P-52), a Kership-class corvette launched in 2020.
