= P36 =

P36 or P-36 may refer to:

== Vessels ==
- ARA Piedra Buena (P-36), a ship of the Argentine Navy
- HMS P36 (1916), a P-class sloop of the Royal Navy
- HMS P36 (1941), a submarine of the Royal Navy
- INS Agray (P36), ships of the Indian Navy

== Other uses ==
- Curtiss P-36 Hawk, an American fighter aircraft
- Papyrus 36, a biblical manuscript
- Petrobras 36, a collapsed oil platform
- Phosphorus-36, an isotope of phosphorus
- Soviet locomotive class P36, a steam locomotive

== See also ==
- R-36 (missile) (Russian: Р-36), with a Cyrillic Р instead of a Latin P.
