= Villa Iris =

- Town
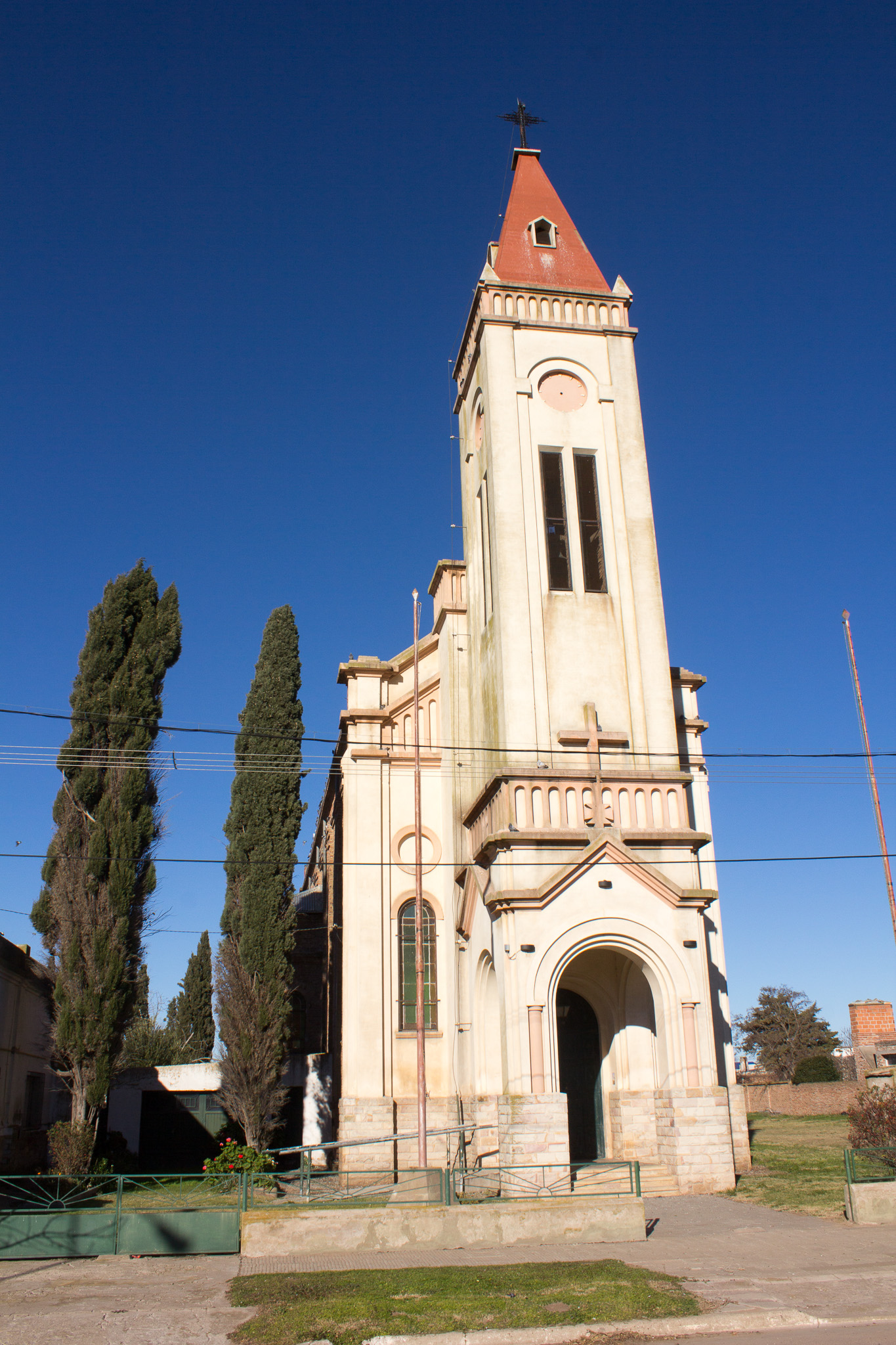
- The church, taken in 2018

- Location within Buenos Aires Province
- Coordinates: 38°10′S 63°15′W
- Country: Argentina
- Province: Buenos Aires
- Partidos: Puan
- Established: May 27, 1900
- Elevation: 186 m (610 ft)

Population (2001 Census)
  - Total: 1,950
- Time zone: UTC−3 (ART)
- CPA Base: B 8126
- Climate: Dfc

Villa Iris is a town located in the Puan Partido in the province of Buenos Aires, Argentina.

== Geography ==
Villa Iris is located 671 km (417 mi) from the city of Buenos Aires.

== History ==
Rail service began in the town on May 27, 1900, the same day of the town's founding. Villa Iris was founded by Don Stroeder, a German immigrant. The town was established on a large livestock and agricultural center. The name of the town was possibly inspired by a play from Pietro Mascagni, an Italian composer, though it is more widely believed the town was named after a resident's daughter. Rail service ended in 1977 and the station closed in 1991.

== Population ==
According to INDEC, which collects population data for the country, the town had a population of 1,950 people as of the 2001 census.

== Events ==
The town hosts the "Fiesta del Churro", which began in 2012. The festival involves the production of up to 15,000 churros each year.
