= Estela, Argentina =

Village in Buenos Aires, Argentina

Coordinates: 38.117°S 62.917°W

Estela is a small village in Puan Partido, Buenos Aires Province, Argentina.
