= Murature-class patrol ship =

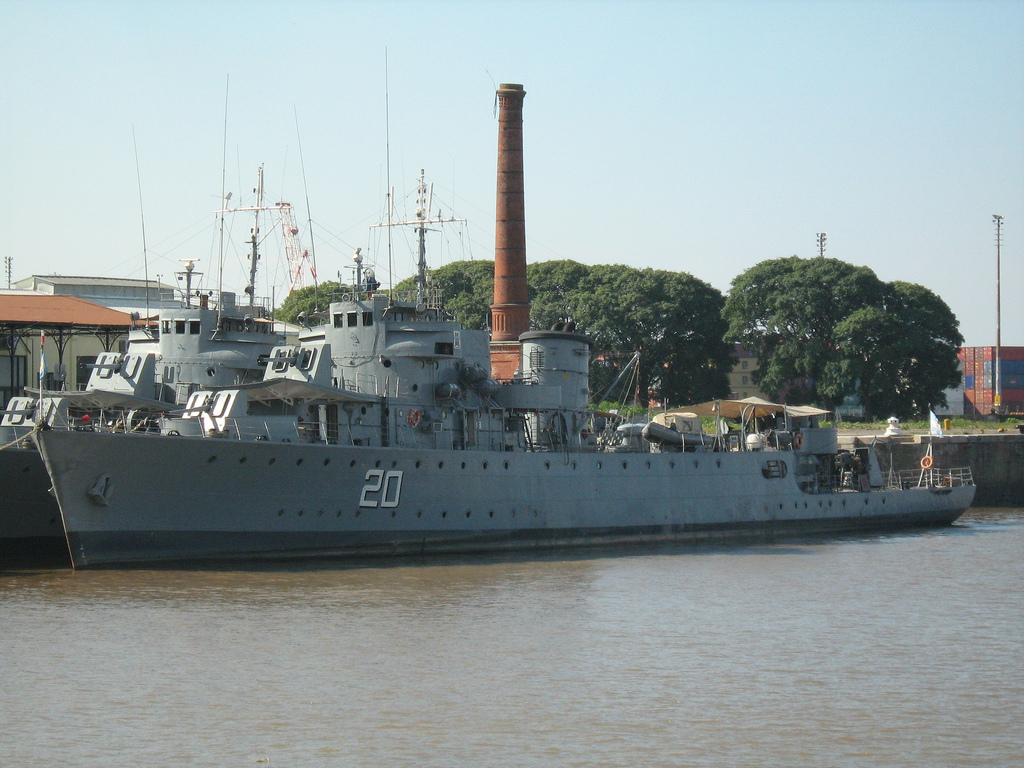
- ARA Murature (P-20) in 2010

Class overview
- Name: Murature class patrol ship
- Builders: AFNE Rio Santiago, Argentina
- Operators: Argentine Navy
- In commission: 1945 - present
- Planned: 2
- Completed: 2
- Active: 1
- Retired: 1

General characteristics
- Type: Murature class patrol ship
- Displacement: 1030 tons
- Length: 77 m (252.6 ft)
- Beam: 9 m (29.5 ft)
- Draft: 4 m (13 ft)
- Propulsion: 2-shaft, 2 × Werkspoor Diesel engines, 2,500 ihp (1,900 kW), 90 tons oil
- Speed: 18 knots (21 mph; 33 km/h)
- Range: 9000 nautical miles @ 12kn
- Complement: 130
- Armament: 3 × 105-millimetre (4 in) L45 Bofors DP guns; 4 × 40 mm (1.6 in) Bofors AA guns

The Murature-class patrol ships are a class of World War II era Argentine Navy warships, originally classified as minelayers and later reclassified as patrol ships. The class is named after José Luis Murature, Foreign Minister of Argentina from 1916 to 1918.

== Design ==
The class was as part of a program to build four mine warfare ships during the Second World War. Two (Murature and King) were completed as patrol ships and the others (Piedrabuena and Azopardo) as antisubmarine frigates.

== History ==
Murature was laid down in 1944 and commissioned in 1945, while her sister King was launched in 1943 and commissioned in 1946. In 1955 both took part of the rising against Juan Domingo Perón's government known as Revolución Libertadora, when she protected as a floating battery the rebel naval base at Río Santiago and was strafed by loyal Gloster Meteor jet fighters.

According to Capitán de navio (R) Benjamín Cosentino who acted as anti-submarine advisor to the Officer in Tactical Command, Argentine Destroyer Force in February 1960, he was sent to the School of Naval Warfare that month to write the final report on the 1960 Golfo Nuevo incident for the Argentine Naval General Staff. In this incident, one or possibly two intruder submarines of unknown flag were present in Golfo Nuevo, Chubut Province, between the period 31 January and 17 February 1960 and eluded or survived all attempts to sink them. One or other of the Murature patrol ships were involved in all six depth-charge or gunnery attacks along the coastal shallows: Murature on 4th, 7th (evening), 11th and in company with King on 16 February 1960: King on 5th, 7th (morning) and along with Murature on 16 February 1960.

Murature was the oldest unit still in service in the Argentine navy as of 2014 when she was decommissioned; her sister King remained as the oldest unit still in service in the Argentine navy as of late 2015.

== Specifications ==
- Length: 77m
- Beam: 9m
- Draft: 4m
- Displacement: 1030 tons
- Propulsion: 2-shaft, 2 x Werkspoor Diesel engines, 2500 ihp, 90 tons oil
- Speed: 18 knots (21 mph; 33km/h)
- Range: 9000nm @ 12kn
- Complement: 130
- Armament:
- 3 x 105-millimetre (4in) L45 Bofors DP guns, 4 x 40mm Bofors AA guns

== Ships in class ==
Ship name	Hull number	Commissioned	Status
Murature	P-20	5 July 1945	Decommissioned 2014; awaiting disposal
King	P-21	1946	Active as of 2019

== See also ==
- List of ships of the Argentine Navy
- Azopardo-class frigate
