= Darregueira =

- Town
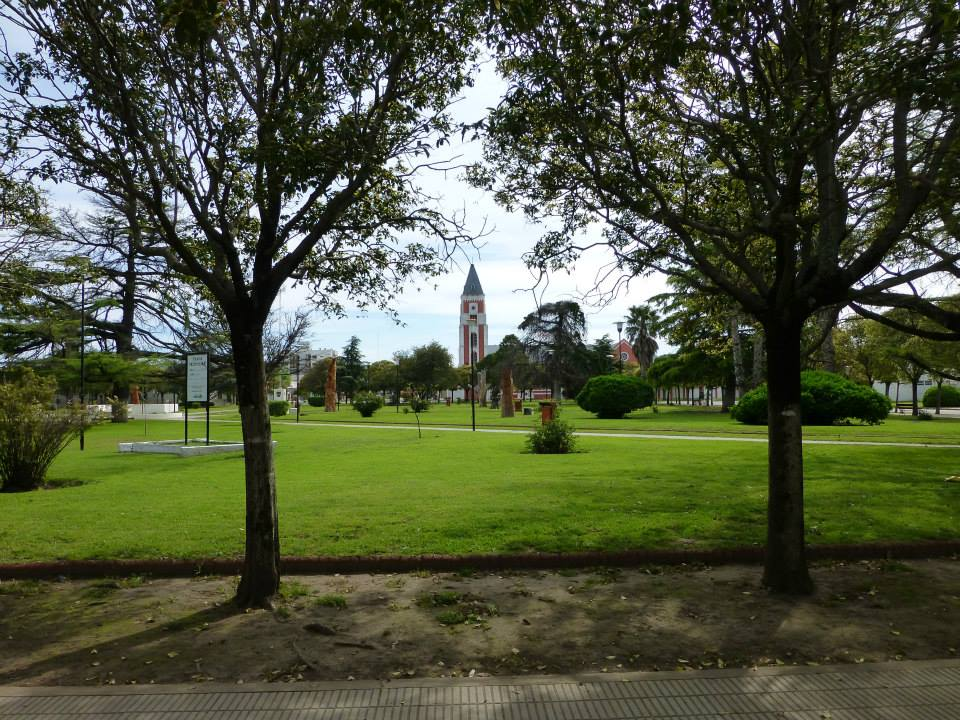
- Town plaza

- Location within Buenos Aires Province
- Coordinates: 37°42′S 63°10′W
- Country: Argentina
- Province: Buenos Aires
- Partidos: Puan
- Established: 1906
- Elevation: 207 m (679 ft)

Population (2001 Census)
  - Total: 5,389
- Time zone: UTC−3 (ART)
- CPA Base: B 8183
- Climate: Dfc

Darregueira is a town located in the Puan Partido in the province of Buenos Aires, Argentina.

== History ==
The area that would become Darregueira was first visited by Spanish settlers in 1688. The town itself was founded in 1906. Until 1927, the town was erroneously spelled "Darragueira".

An electricity cooperative was established in Darregueira in 1946. In recent years, the town's infrastructure has improved, with several modernizations of the power and water network taking place.

== Population ==
According to INDEC, which collects population data for the country, the town had a population of 5,389 people as of the 2001 census.
