= ARA King (P-21) =

Argentine Navy warship

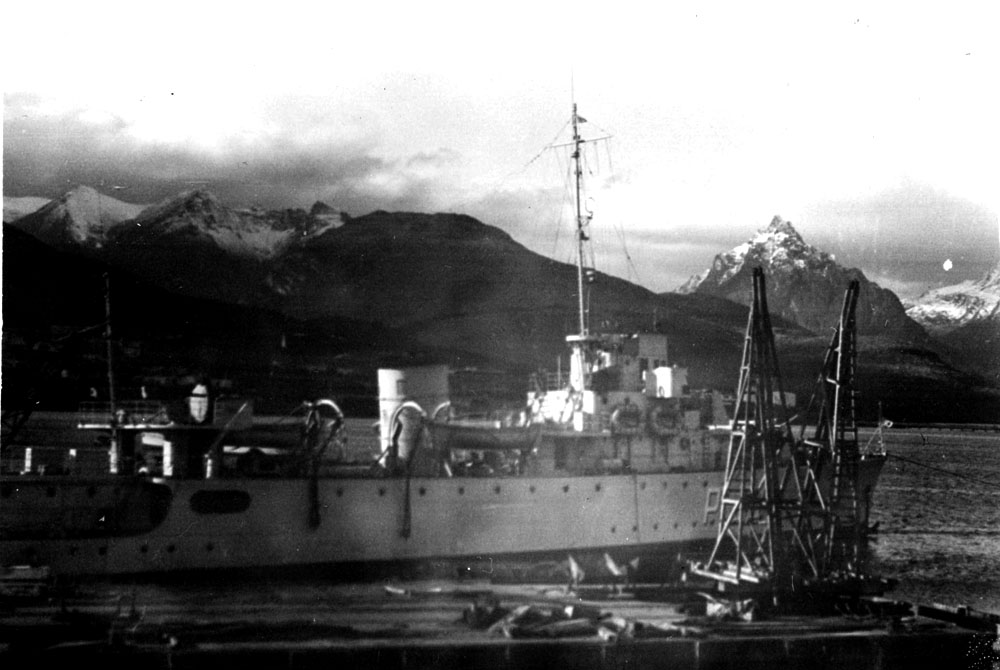
- ARA King in Ushuaia, circa 1947

History

Argentina
- Name: King
- Namesake: Juan King, Argentine naval officer in the Cisplatine War.
- Builder: AFNE Rio Santiago, Argentina
- Launched: 1943
- Commissioned: 1946
- Status: Active

General characteristics
- Type: Murature-class patrol boat
- Displacement: 1,030 tons
- Length: 77 m (252 ft 7 in)
- Beam: 9 m (29 ft 6 in)
- Draft: 4 m (13 ft 1 in)
- Propulsion: 2-shaft, 2 × Werkspoor diesel engines, 2,500 ihp (1,900 kW), 90 tons oil
- Speed: 18 knots (33 km/h; 21 mph)
- Range: 9,000 nmi (17,000 km; 10,000 mi) at 12 knots (22 km/h; 14 mph)
- Complement: 130
- Armament: 3 × 105-millimetre (4 in) L45 Bofors DP guns; 4 × 40 mm (1.6 in) Bofors AA guns

ARA King is a World War II-era Argentine Navy warship, originally classified as minelayer and later as patrol ship. The vessel is named after Juan King, an Argentine naval officer that served in the Cisplatine War. It is the third Argentine naval ship with this name.

== Design ==
King was as part of a program to build four minelayers during the Second World War. Two (Murature and King) were completed as patrol boats and the others (Piedrabuena and Azopardo) as antisubmarine frigates.

== History ==
King was launched in 1943 and commissioned in 1946.

In 1955, the ship took part of rising against Juan Domingo Perón's government known as Revolución Libertadora, when she acted as a floating battery defending the rebel naval base at Río Santiago.

After the decommissioning of her sister Murature in 2014, King is the oldest still in service in the Argentine navy. She was overhauled from 2015 to 2018 and was still in service as of 2022.

In July 2023, the ship was involved in a collision with a floating bar on the Paraná River and a Naval Prefecture vessel. The damage was reported as minor.

== See also ==
- List of ships of the Argentine Navy
