= ARA Azopardo (1922) =

History

Argentina
- Name: Azopardo
- Namesake: Juan Bautista Azopardo
- Builder: Bethlehem Co., Boston, United States
- Launched: 1919
- Acquired: 1922
- Commissioned: 1922
- Decommissioned: 1941
- Out of service: 1936
- Home port: Buenos Aires; Puerto Belgrano
- Fate: Sold for scrap 1943
- Notes: Formerly the American Barstow, was transferred to Argentina as compensation for damages.

General characteristics
- Type: Tug
- Displacement: 437 tons
- Length: 45.71 m (150.0 ft)
- Beam: 8.4 m (27.6 ft)
- Draft: 5 m (16 ft)
- Installed power: 1,800 ihp (1,300 kW)
- Propulsion: 2-shaft, 2 × triple expansion steam engines, 900hp each; 2 boilers; 250 tons coal
- Speed: max 14 knots (16 mph; 26 km/h); cruise 8 knots (9.2 mph; 15 km/h)
- Range: 20 days at sea, maximum
- Complement: 21
- Armament: none
- Notes: Career and characteristics data from "Histarmar" website.

ARA Azopardo was a tugboat of the Argentine Navy, built in the Bethlehem Shipyard in 1919 and transferred to Argentina in 1922. It was based at the port of Buenos Aires and later at Puerto Belgrano, and it was decommissioned in 1941. The vessel was named after the Juan Bautista Azopardo, a Maltese privateer and officer of the Argentine Navy during the Independence and Cisplatine wars, and was the second Argentine naval ship with this name.

== Design ==
Azopardo was a steam tugboat built in 1919 at the Bethlehem Co., in Boston. It had a single funnel and two simple masts.

It was powered by two triple expansion steam engines of 900 hp each, with two boilers, driving two propellers. It could carry 250 tons of coal, and consumed a maximum of 20 tons of coal per day, giving it a maximum range of 20 days at sea.

It was equipped with a "Lidgerwood" steam engine on its stern, for towing ships. It also had a refrigerated store, and electric searchlights.

== History ==
Azopardo was launched in 1919 in the United States, as Barstow. It was transferred to Argentina in 1922 by the US Navigation Board, to compensate for the damages caused by the ship American Legion in the port of Buenos Aires.

It was commissioned by the Argentine Navy in December 1922 by O. G. 211/922, and put in service in the port of Buenos Aires. In December 1924 was transferred to Puerto Belgrano. From 1925 to 1928 was part of the "Instruction Division", until that unit was dissolved. It remained on auxiliary tasks on port until 1929 when was assigned to the 1st Division of the Sea Fleet, serving until 1931 with it. From 1932 onwards had different assignments within Puerto Belgrano, until put out of service in 1936.

Between 1936 and 1939 had sporadic use; finally in 1941 was decommissioned and scheduled for disposal (decree Nº 91.352, 17 May 1941). It was sold in 1943, to be scrapped.

== See also ==
- List of auxiliary ships of the Argentine Navy
