= Azopardo, Buenos Aires =

Azopardo
- Town
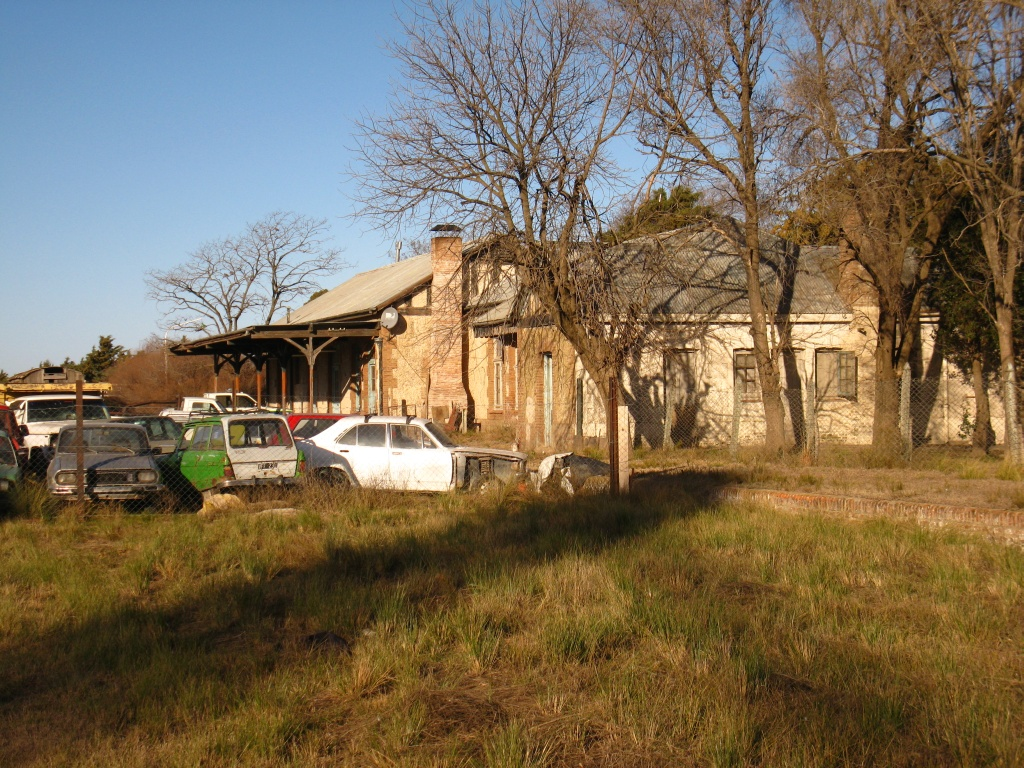

- Location within Buenos Aires Province
- Coordinates: 37°44′S 62°55′W
- Country: Argentina
- Province: Buenos Aires
- Partidos: Puan
- Established: March 8, 1904
- Elevation: 240 m (790 ft)

Population (2001 Census)
  - Total: 92
- Time zone: UTC−3 (ART)
- CPA Base: B 8181
- Climate: Dfc

Azopardo is a town located in the Puan Partido in the province of Buenos Aires, Argentina.

== History ==
The land now making up Azopardo was originally inhabited by Mapuche settlers. A railway station was constructed in the town in 1906.

== Population ==
According to INDEC, which collects population data for the country, the town had a population of 92 people as of the 2001 census.
