= Puan Partido =

Puan Partido de Puan
- Department
- location of Puán partido in Buenos Aires Province
- Coordinates: 37°33′S 62°46′W
- Country: Argentina
- Established: July 28, 1886
- Founder: Salvador Maldonado
- Seat: Puan

Government
  - Intendant: Diego Reyes (UCR)

Area
  - Total: 6,835 km^{2} (2,639 sq mi)

Population
  - Total: 16,381
  - Density: 2.397/km^{2} (6.207/sq mi)
- Demonym: puanense
- Postal Code: B8180
- IFAM: BUE099
- Area Code: 02923
- Patron saint: Inmaculada Concepción de María
- Website: puan.gob.ar

Puan Partido is a partido in the south-west of Buenos Aires Province, Argentina.

The provincial subdivision has a population of about 16,000 inhabitants in an area of 6,835 km^{2} (2,639 sq mi), and its capital city is Puan, which is around 575 km (357 mi) from Buenos Aires.

== Economy ==
The economy of Puan Partido is dominated by agriculture. The main crops are wheat, barley, and oats, which are processed in the Maltería Pampa (Pampa brewery), which is one of the largest breweries in South America.

Other agricultural products of the region are sunflowers, soya beans, and maize. Beef farming also plays a major role in the rural economy; the main breeds are Aberdeen Angus and Polled Hereford.

== Settlements ==
Foundation dates of settlements in Puán Partido
Settlement	Foundation	Railway
Azopardo	March 8, 1904	Jan 1906
Bordenave	November 10, 1906	
Darregueira	October 5, 1906	
Estela		December 1908
Felipe Solá	January 20, 1908	January 1906
López Lecube		October 1906
Puan	June 5, 1876	
Rivadeo		December 1908
Rondeau		February 1891
San Germán	March 23, 1909	
Tres cuervos	January 20, 1908	
Víboras		Jan 1906
Villa Castelar (Erize)		May 1899
Villa Durcudoy (17 de agosto)	August 17, 1904	
Villa Iris	May 27, 1900	
