= Puan, Buenos Aires =

Puan
- Location in Argentina
- Coordinates: 37°32′54.71″S 62°46′17.55″W
- Country: Argentina
- Province: Buenos Aires
- Partido: Puan
- Founded: June 5, 1876

Government
  - Intendant: Diego Reyes (UCR)
- Elevation: 222 m (728 ft)

Population (2001 census [INDEC])
  - Total: 4,735
- Demonym: Puanenses
- CPA Base: B 8180
- Area code: +54 2923

Puan is a town in the province of Buenos Aires, Argentina. It is the administrative centre of the Puan Partido.

== Geography ==
Puan is located next to a lagoon of the same name, which itself contains an island within it. The island was declared a Natural and Cultural Reserve site. Puan is located 80 km (50 mi) from the city of Coronel Suárez, and 577 km (359 mi) from the city of Buenos Aires.

== History ==
Before being established as a town, Puan served as a frontier post during the Conquest of the Desert.

Puan was founded in 1876. In 1911, a hospital and school were completed, the opening of which was attended by the Archbishop of La Plata. Funding for the hospital was partially provided by Marcelino Ugarte, at the time governor of the Buenos Aires Province. In 1914, a large statue of Adolfo Alsina was inaugurated in the central town square, which was also renamed after him. The statue was sculpted by Emilio T. Andina. In 1968, while constructing a housing project in Puan, human remains from an cavalry regiment were found in the area. In total, 29 graves were found, 16 of which belonged to soldiers, with the remainder being natives. In 1979, a square in honor of the soldiers found, the Plaza de la Patria, was completed, containing a monument to the unidentified soldiers found in the site. In 2012, construction began on a hotel adjacent to the plaza. The decision was met with protest by some residents, who argued the hotel would weaken the importance of the monument.

Puan contains several monasteries frequented by religious tourists, especially during Easter and other religious holidays. In 2010, the Mirador Millenium was opened, a tower inspired by the designs of Roman wells.

== Population ==
According to INDEC, which collects population data for the country, the town had a population of 4,735 people as of the 2001 census.
