= Mizo clothing =

Traditional and modern dress in Mizoram

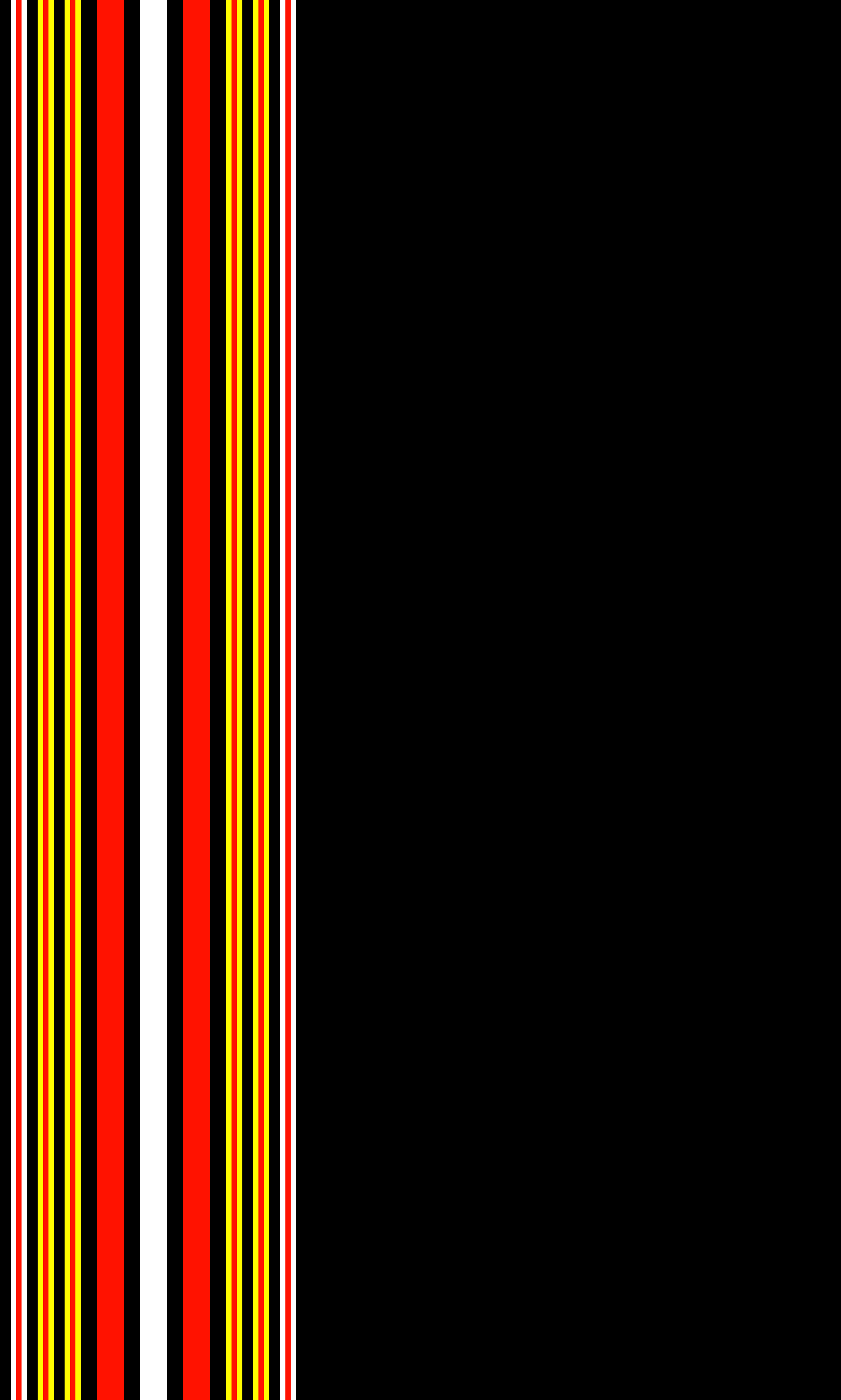
Example of Tawlhoh Puan (transl. Puan of No Retreat) pattern.

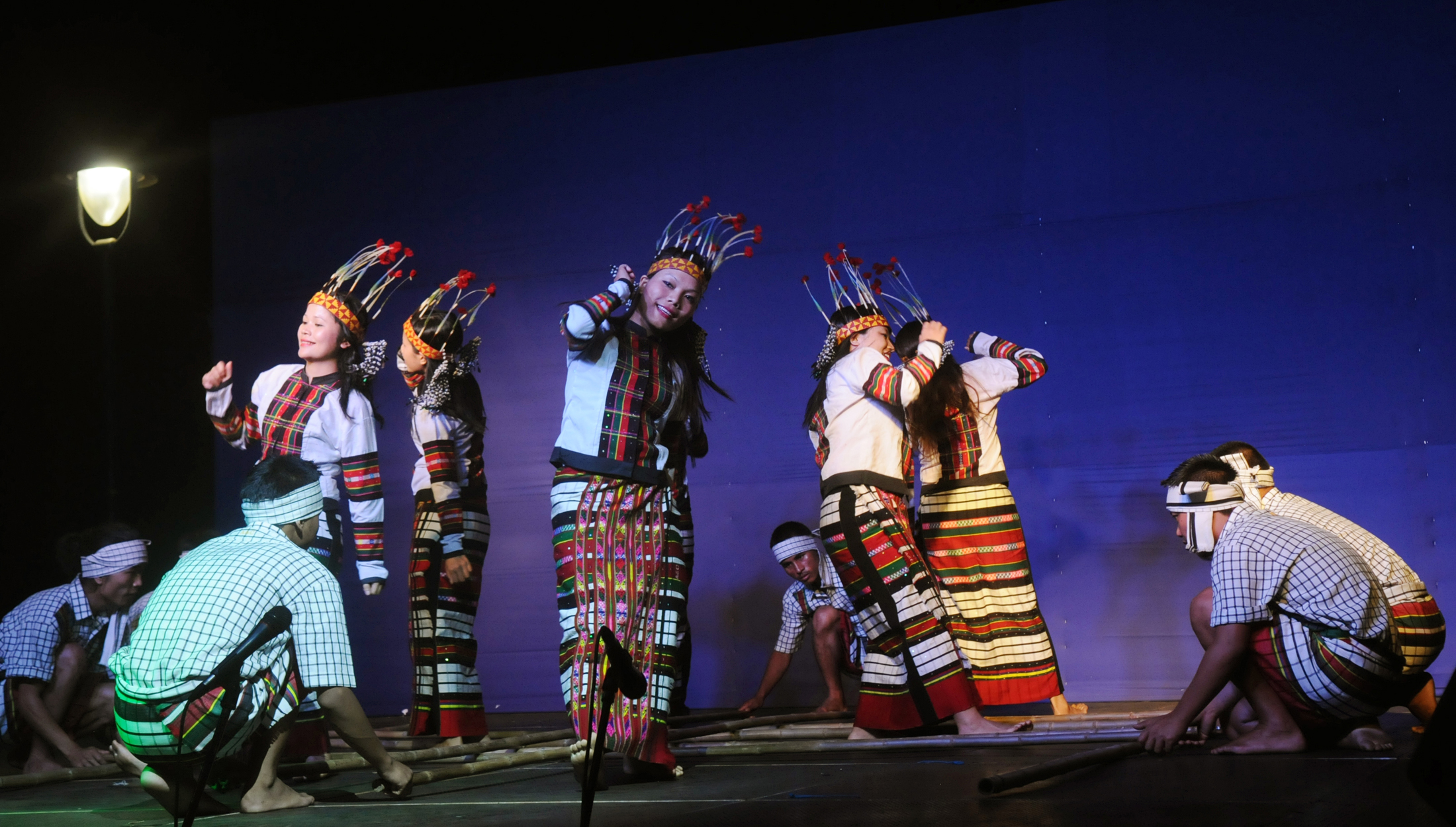
Traditional Mizo attire during the Cheraw dance

Mizo clothing or puan refers to the dress and garments worn by the Mizo people historically and in the modern day.

== History ==
The earliest clothes worn by the Mizos were known as siapsuap (swing or flap) for women and hnawkhawl for men. Both genders would wear a skirt made of broadcloth from the bark of trees or reed which would cover up to the knee from the waist. The main difference in men's clothing was that it was woven in bigger pieces. This was used to cover up the upper half of the body from the elements.

The Mizos eventually transitioned into cotton clothing known at puan halp. The Mizos grew their cotton on their jhum lands and used their own tools to loom and weave cloth. Cotton blooms were dried in the sun before being processed for weaving. The first stage was extracting the seeds from the cotton. This was accomplished via a machine known as herawt. A herawt is a homemade gin consisting of a frame holding two wooden rollers. The end of the rollers is carved into a screw grooved in opposing directions to each other. When the handles turned, the cotton is drawn and the seeds are squeezed out. The next step is to distribute the cotton using a lasai. A lasai is a bamboo stick with a wide base and a narrow top, with a cane string tied similarly to a bow. The cotton is teased into this bow about five times to become clean. Cotton is then placed on a smooth plank and rolled with the stem of a tall grass called hmunphiah to make cotton threat that is well spread and spool systematically. The cotton is stored in chawnzial, a special bamboo mat that stores raw cotton for spinning. Thread is extracted from the cotton via a Hmui. Hmui is a spinning wheel made from wood and cane. The spindle is made of iron and held via a wooden stand. The threat was created for a huge skein of cotton using Ladinlek, a sharpened pieace of wood with holes drilled under the tips to wind the cotton yarn via bamboo sticks. A skein of cotton was cooked with rice to bind it and hung in the sun to dry on a lazar. A lazar is a bamboo pole supported by two upright posts, which is made for drying the hank of the thread. A large stick is placed between the hands of the thread. A lakhuih is used on the cotton to make it smooth and firm for weaving cloth. Lakhuih is a comb for cotton yarn.Lastly, the cotton is rolled off a machine known as a suvel into a ball of yarn. A suvel is a revolving tool to spin balls of yarn around a small stone or pebble. It is made of wood and bamboo and designed to stand independently.

Originally, the Mizos used a loom loom before transitioning into frame loom, Zo looms, and fly shuttles. it would take two weeks to prepare for one puan with 12kg of cotton reeled for several days on a dynamo. The loom weaver is secured with backstraps and lays one leg on the footrest. Weaving oversaw casting, plucking and striking. Depending on the complexity of the pattern, a basic puan is weaved over 2-3 day while a complex one can take up to a week. A puan is produced at a length of 50-65 inches long.

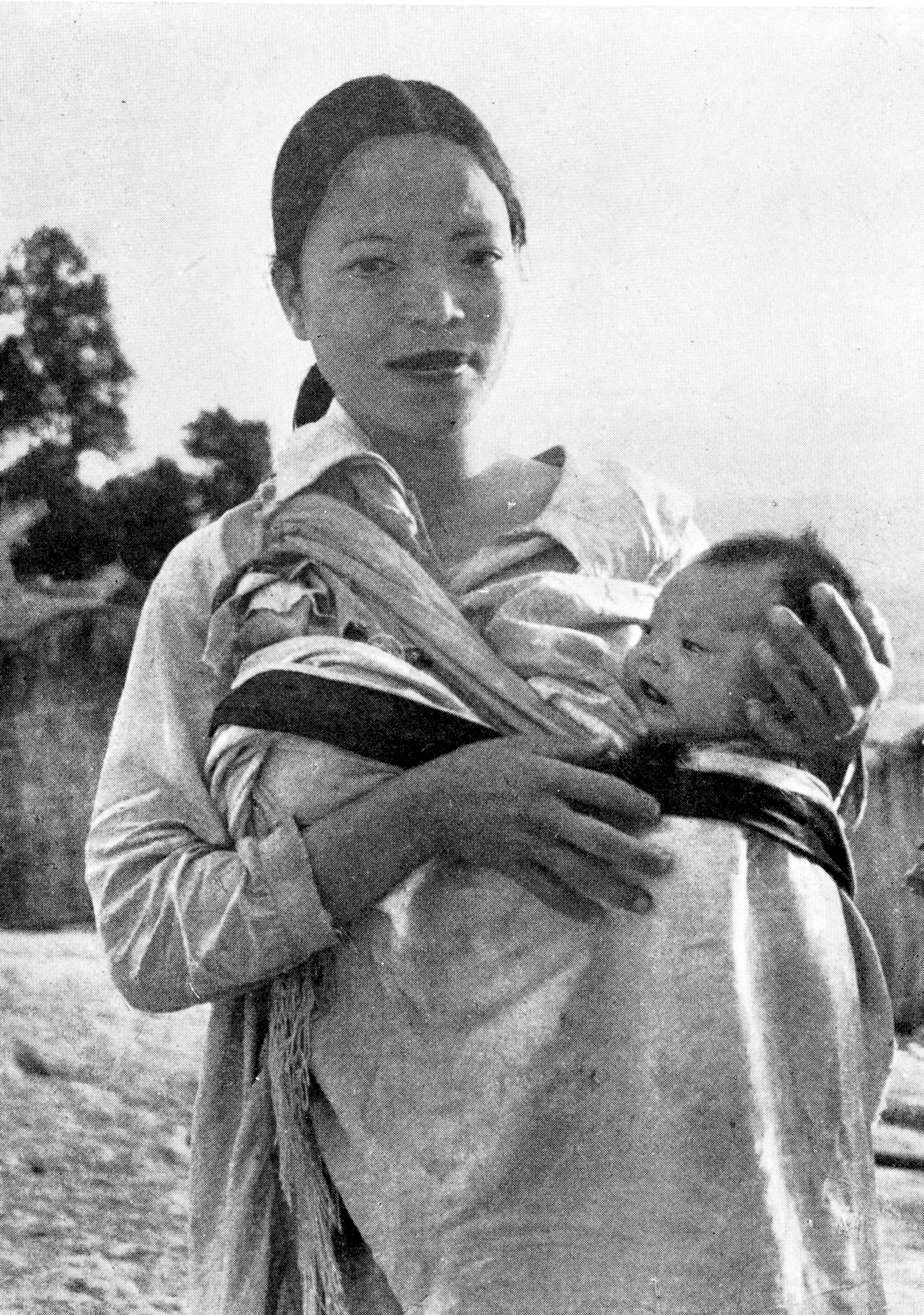
Mizo woman in the 1940s

Originally the Puan was a yard in length and 44-54 inches in breadth in a simple thick white cloth for both men and women. Another piece of a bigger size was given to men to cover their upperbody and use it as utility such as cold temperatures, bedding and blankets for sleeping in the zawlbuk. These Puan were known as Puanngo until the discovery of natural dyes, particularly the black dye made from certain roots and leaves. The tunics began to utilize a black border or black stripes. Over time more dyes were discovered with natural herbs and remedies to introduce more colours such as red, yellow, green and blue. This led to an increase in design variations. The oldest Puan design is Kawkpuizikzial. The Kawkpuizikzial was made in the likeness of a leafy vegetable with tips curled in small round loops. The next design following this would be the disul. Following the first two designs, the Puan entered into the stage of puanchei with beautiful patterns. In the earlier days, the Puan was the only garment worn by the Mizos. It was worn via one end held on the left arm with the cloth wrapping around the waist from the backside the other end place under the right armpit and placed on the right shoulder to cover the whole body. The flaps on the cloth arranged in this way prevented the cloth from sliding off the body. After the introduction of a second cloth for the upper body of males, did new designs and dressing arrangements become introduced. The Puan also changed between the genders. Men would wear a puan typically from the waist to the knees, while women would wear their puan below their knees from their waist.

With the advent of British interaction in the Lushai Hills, the tribes began to wear the kawrchei for covering the upper body of adult women. The kawrchei was made of two rectangular pieces, each about a yard long, with the breadth covering half of the body. The two pieces were sewn together in a way that permits arms to go into holes on the side, and the head on top. As a result, the kawrchei appeared more as a blouse.

After the British annexation of Mizoram, Mizo culture began to change with the influence of Christianity and westernization. In the 1920s the puan began to decline among men and became obsolete or rare by the 1960s as a growing intellgentsia influenced clothing culture in Aizawl. By the 1940s, Mizo women began to adopt western fashion with braids, curls and hair accessories such as hair clips, ribbons and scarves. This was a departure from the historically style of smoothly combered hair tightened in a bun at the nape. Women adopted blouses with western designs using fabrics such as polyester from Silchar and Sylhet with introduction of necklaces, bangles and earrings. Since tailoring was part of the school curriculum for Christian education centres in Mizoram at the time, many women began to stitch their own clothes for themselves and their family influencing the fashion of Mizoram. Women who studied outside of Mizoram were exposed to cosmopolitan trends and brought back increasingly modern western fashion. This includes, miniskirts, dresses, long jackets, pants, kitten heels, Oxfords and Saris. The chieftainess Banaitangi who visited Cachar frequently adopted the Indian sari, along with Ziki the first women to attain master's degree studied outside of Mizoram and dressed in the Sari when visiting Sylhet. This is argued by Varsangzuali that Indian fashion held considerable influence before the adoption of Western attire.

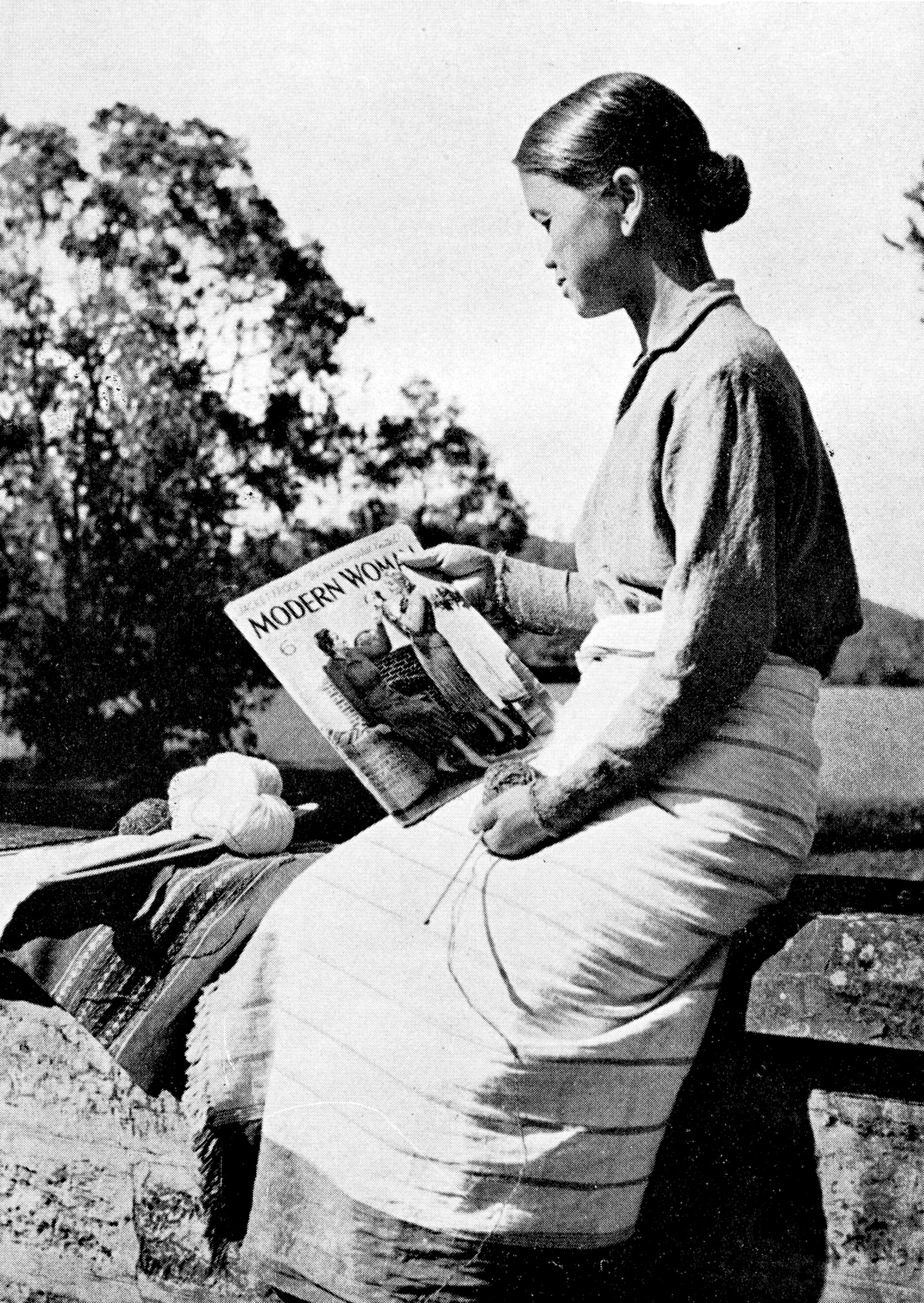
Mizo woman wearing a western blouse and puan.

Despite adoption of western attire, women continued to stitch and weave their puan. Varsangzuali argues that women maintained the continuity of the puan which contributed to a unique hybridization of western and Mizo clothes. White blouses were paired with the puanchei or a plain white puan with a gown. Women also adopted wedding trousseaus. With educated men dressing in suits and boots, women matched the men in fashion by adopting heels, gowns and veils in weddings. However within the rural areas, access to footwear was a luxury which was difficult to afford. Shoes were perceived as a status symbol regardless of its quality such as leather, canvas, heel or sandals. However as it was not a common part of Mizo attire many people chose not to wear them and asserted it was too restricting.

Furthermore the influence of World War I and World War II introduced new influences in fashion. Self-care and cosmetics were introduced to the Mizos after the First World War when soldiers brought back soaps and cosmetics along with other items of grooming and cleanliness. The onset of World War Two significantly affected women's fashion in Mizoram as they were recruited into clerical positions, hospitals and auxiliary. Women would wear the uniform and be expected to wear shoes in the course of their service and this became integrated outside of their service and work. Influences of western fashion such as lipstick and hats also found their way to Mizo women via interactions with white women.

== Men's clothing ==
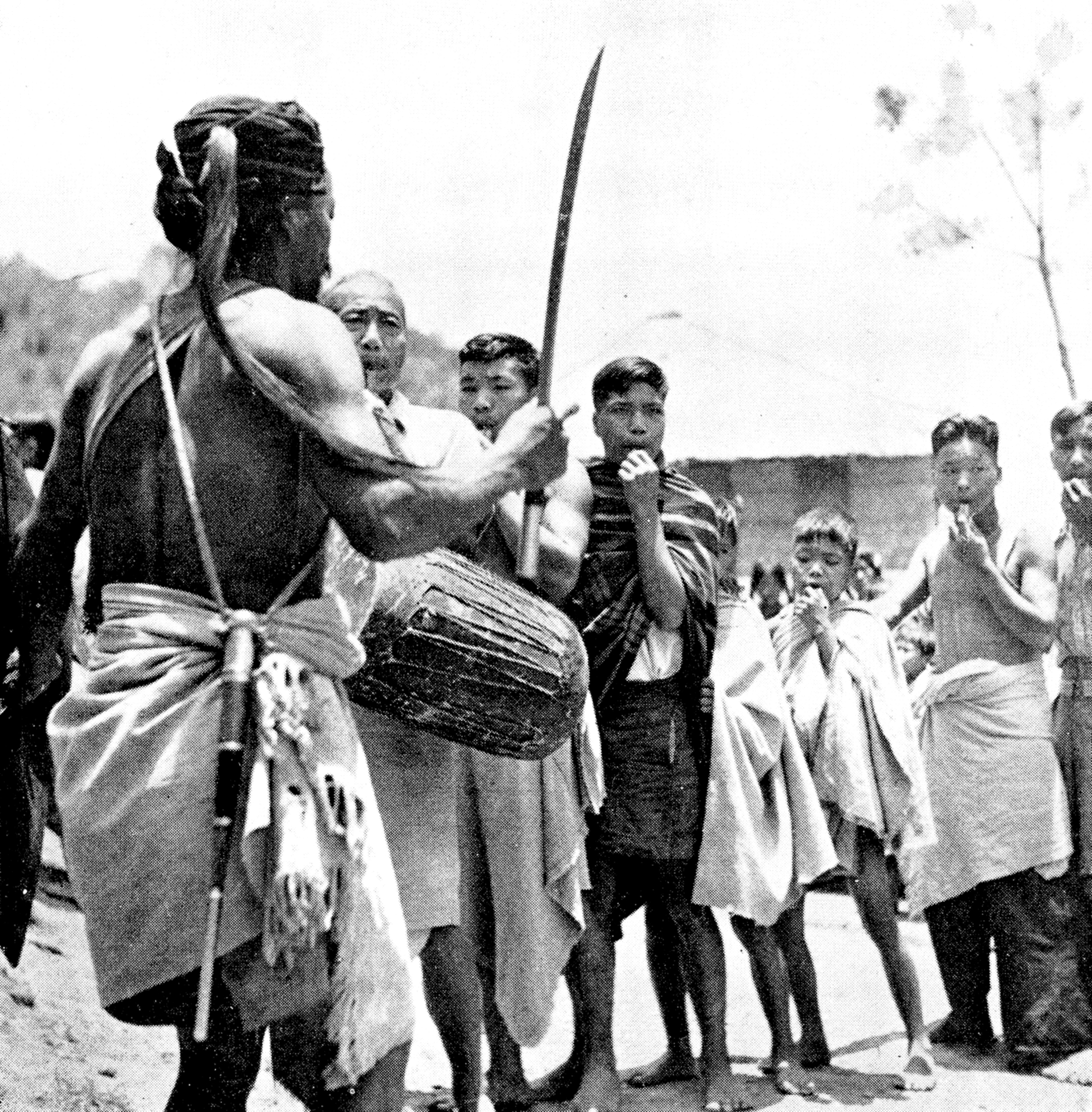
Mizo men wearing puan

=== Thangchhuah attire ===
The thangchhuah would wear several unique pieces of attire for their position such as the puantial and diar. The puantial carried social significance and could only be worn by an individual who had performed the Thangchhuah ceremony. It could only be attained by sacrificing a mithun to the community several times in feasts. Apart from a thangchhuahpa this cloth could only be worn by a chief and his wife.

Thangchhuah diar is a decorated turban that can only be worn by a thangchhuahpa after the Thangchhuah ceremony. The thangchhuar kawr was a shirt produced from handwoven black cloth which was designed red, yellow and white checks.

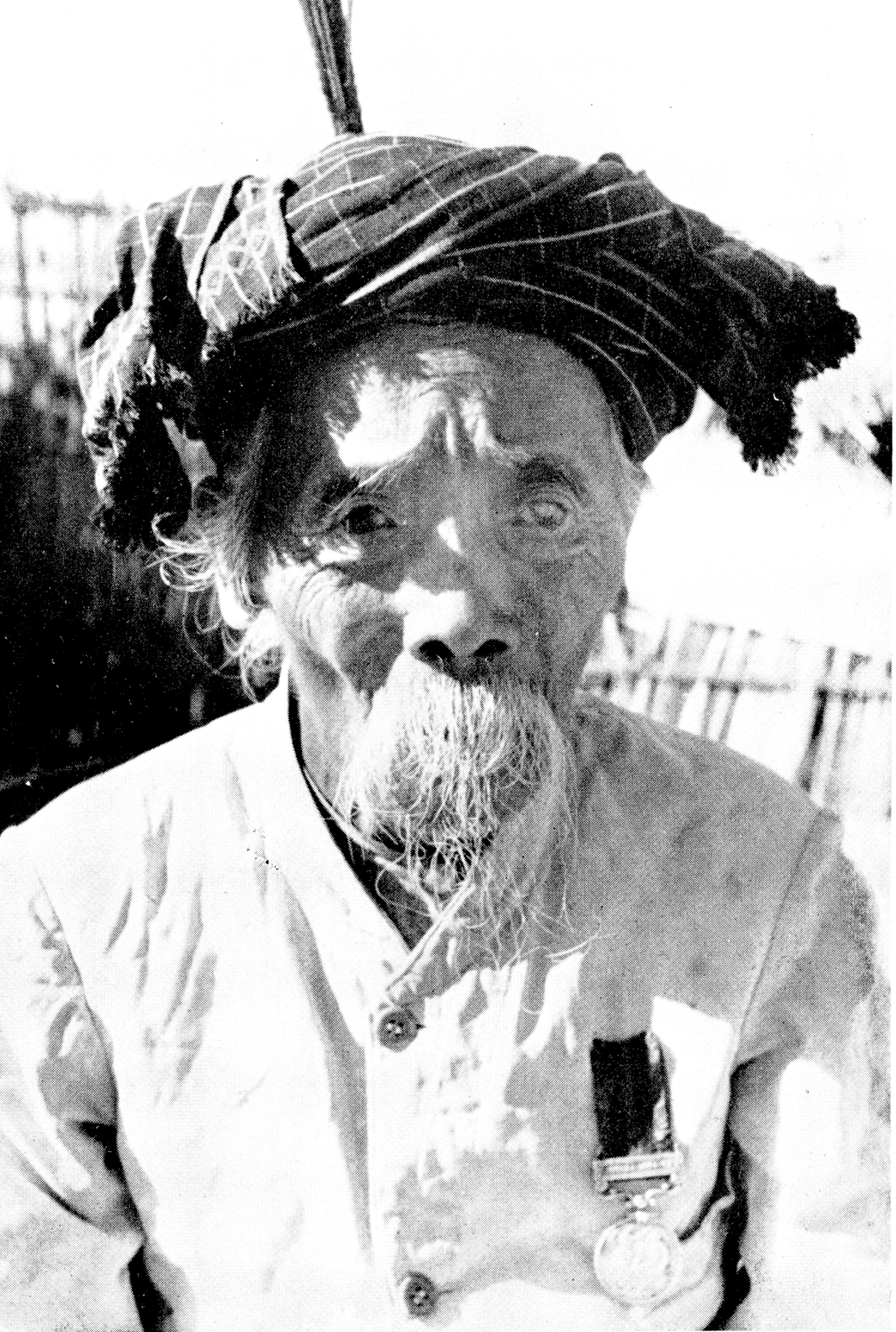
Pu Dâra, interpreter and friend of John Shakespear wearing a decorated turban.

=== Chief attire ===
Mangpuan was a specific cloth only to be worn by a chief and his wife on certain occasions. Thlantla chang was a turban with the feathers of a vakul. This could only be worn by a chief or a thangchhuahpa.

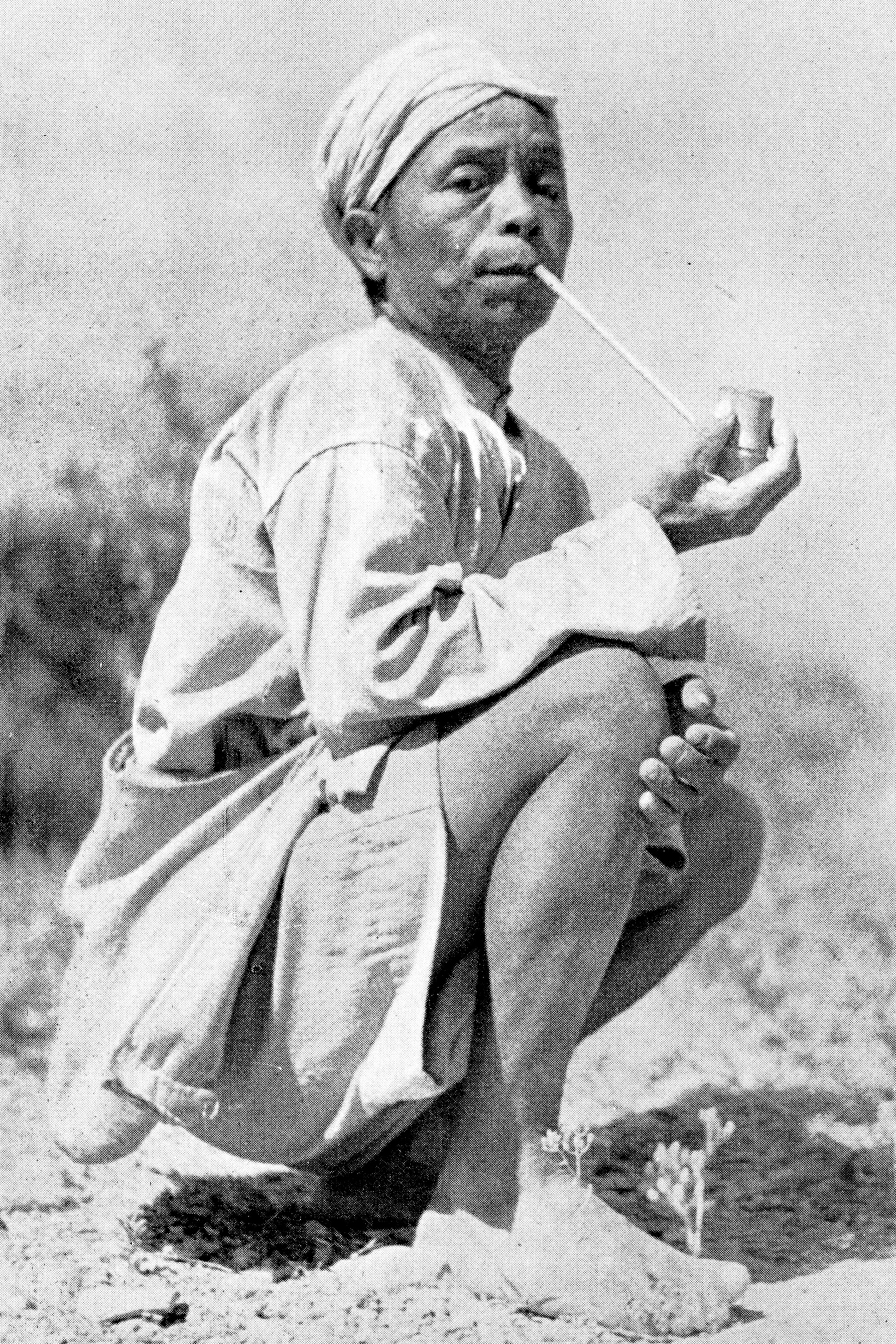
Lushai man smoking tobacco.

=== Pasaltha attire ===
Tawlhloh puan means the cloth of never retreating. This would be worn by warriors or leaders of raiding parties. To wear the tawlhloh puan signified that a warrior would not return home unless they were victorious. It was produced at a length of 2 metres and a width of 1.5 metres with a white surface. Four black strips consisting of four interlaced threads were weaved into the design. During the colonial period, the Mizo pasaltha would wear the Tawlhloh puan to fight the British in the Lushai Rising. The tawlhloh puan eventually acquired popularity via use by wealhly women and associated with prestige rather than honor.

Chawn is a special headdress worn by Mizo warriors. It is made of goat's hair, dyed in red and fixed piece of wood which has the feather of a hornbill attached to it. This turban could only be worn after a man completed a headhunting ceremony over an enemy killed. A common man would wear a plain white turban known as a diarvar.

=== Puandum ===
Puandum means black cloth. Puan is cloth and dum is black. The puan would have a darkbackground and two edges would be kept red. This is then followed with bold bands of blue, yellow, green and pink. The puandum would hence be very colourful as the dark background was filled with bands of varying colors. The black wool would be stretched across the bands to make a deeper vibrant colour in the bands, however this would be intricate and difficult. A girl was expected to weave one puandum to take with her in her thul (cane basket) when she would get married. If she had failed to do then she was expected to weave one soon after going to her in-law's place as it was socially looked down to not have one. It can also be used by a girl as dowry in marriage known as a zawlpuan. Traditionally, a wife would cover her husband's corpse with her zawlpuan. In this context the puandum would be known as thihrin puan(thi means die). If a wife fails to do so, then she is accused of adultery and denied aid from her husband's relatives. This was also typically worn by young men who resided in the village zawlbuk at night. This cloth was also used during courtship known as dawnpuan phah. This would be used when a couple slept together with the parent's permission. This cloth would also be worn during mourning during funerals.

== Women's clothing ==
=== Puan ===
There are four types of puan. Puanngo is a simple thick white cloth for casual wear. Puanrin is a white striped cloth with a black background. The puanrin is typically woven by women and worn for festivals by well-to-do girls.

Ngotekherh or puanhruih is woven with a white and black background with a contrasting stripe of black or white. Ngotekherh was woven using only black and white threads. It consisted of simple patterns of black and white strips. Two deep black borders were assigned to the long edges of the cloth. After this, black stripes were added to the edges depending on individual preference, which would be around 2-6. Sometimes the black edges are woven with patterns of white wool under the black warp. The quality of Ngotekherh is assessed on the absence of white streaks in the black bars and stripes. Black strips are also hidden among the white cloth areas to give a checkered appearance in certain light conditions. The name Ngotekherh gained its named from the term 'hruih' describing the transverse stripes. While this puan was historically worn by both genders, it is now only worn by women. The ngotekherh was popularised via wealthy individuals in Mizo society. The Ngoterkherh is a traditional puan that was highly prized. The alternative puanhruih, has the component hruih referring to the stripes of the cloth. However puanhruih is an obsolete name as Ngoterkherh has taken over in the vernacular. Ngote refers to a pet name for a young boy or girl, while kherh refers to the same meaning as hruih. Ngotekherh was also used as a shawl by men who wore shirts later on. The Ngotekherh was most popular around the time of the Lushai Expedition until British annexation in the Chin-Lushai Expedition. After British annexation, men adopted Western wear while women maintained the use of ngotekherh.

Puanlaisen or puanchei is a cloth that is woven in multiple colors. Puanchei is considered the most ornamental puan and difficult to weave. This is mostly considered an item of marriage or commonly used for festive dances. The origins of the puanchei are largely unknown. The mixture of colours require several strands of distinctly coloured yarns against a white fabric backdrop. The main colours used as red, black and white. While Puanchei is made for women, in some exceptions men can wear them too. The design of the Puanchei is estimated to have arrived in the middle of the 1800s via the Pawi in Burma.

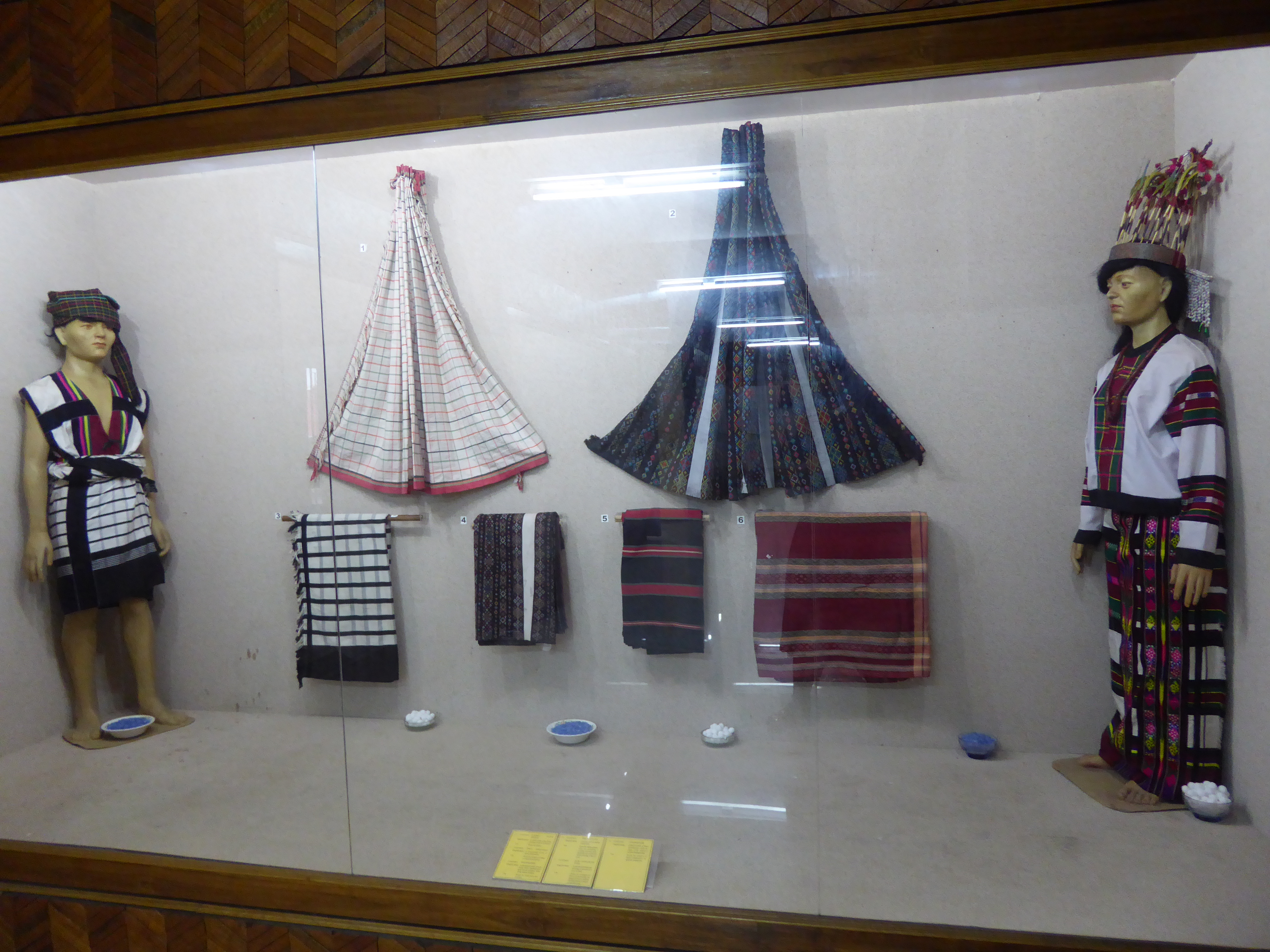
Traditional Mizo puan and vakiria

=== Simple attire ===
Hmaram is a lengthy little skirt. The white warp runs horizontal to a black backdrop with motifs designed on it. Because the material isn't lengthy in terms of width is it worn below the navel and fastened at the waist. In the modern day this is worn rarely in festivals. Fenngo is a simple white skirt worn by women while working on a jhum. Kawlraisen also known as kawrchei is the traditional blouse worn by Mizo women. This was traditionally hand woven but is now typically mill produced.

=== Vakiria ===
Vakiria is a special head dress for Mizo women. It is made of brass, porcupine quills with the tails of parrots and beetle wings hung horizontally. This headdress is worn for festivals and dances. Sometimes it is used as dowry for wealthy individuals.

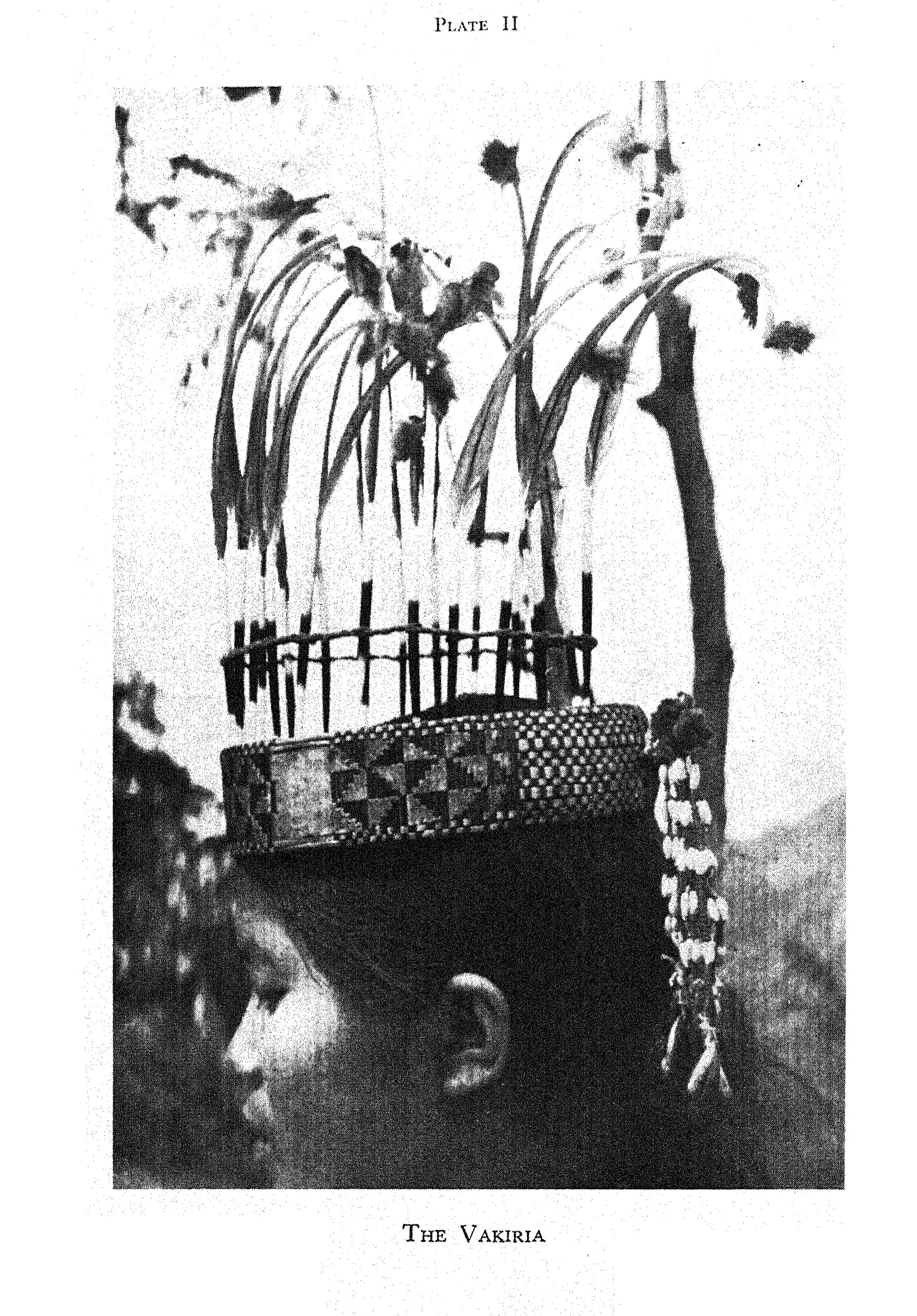
Histoical Picture of the Varkira

== Garments ==
=== Hair accessories ===
Thimkual is a hair knot. The elder men would wear their hair in a knot at the top of the head. Most hairpins would be made of brass and obtained via Burmese trade routes. When a man courts a girl, he grants his thimkual to the girl as security of their commitment. A girl with multiple suiters would receive multiple thimkual. A bakkhil is a hairpin made of ivory, bone and metal, about six to eight inches long. Samkhuih is a hair comb that consists of bamboo or wood about three inches long. Teeth consisting of strips of bamboo, two inches long, are closely inserted and tied together as a thread similar to a flatcomb.

=== Earrings ===
Earrings known as bengbeh were produced in several ways. The wealthiest individuals would wear ivory earrings termed saiha bengbeh inside their ears. It would stretch the earlobes out and make them hang outside of being worn. Poorer individuals would use a wooden earring in their lobe instead. Thibeh was an earring that hanged off the earlobe as a single bead. Thibeh was a status symbol in which those who did not possess one was looked down upon. However, subjects under a Sailo chief were forbidden to wear it even if they could afford it. Thing bengbeh are wooden studded earrings. Men would pierce their ear with a small wooden stud of a flat head and half an inch in diameter. These were handed down generationally or used in dowry.

=== Necklaces ===
Thihna was an amber bead necklace. It was considered a costly priceless possession among Mizo women. The beads are proportionally threaded with a large bead in the middle. The origins of the thihna is estimated to derive from Burma. Children would wear an inferior version of the necklace known as thival. Thifen was a necklace with beads of varying colours worn by both men and women and used specifically for dowry in marriage. Ralleng thi is a Naga inspired necklace worn by the Mizo introduced via the Ralleng people. Tangkathi is a necklace which uses silver Indian coins instead of beads threaded together.

=== Belts ===
Darkawngchilh was a belt made for Mizo women consisting of an imported flat piece of silver. Darzai was a belt worn by both genders consisting of a long spring rod that is wrapped around the waist three times. Rangkha was a belt worn by the wealthiest individuals.

=== Bags ===
Cotton bags were carried by Mizo men during raids and hunting expeditions, holding possessions such as food, weapons, tinder boxes and tobacco. Iptepui refers to a plaint white cloth bag which was assumed to have been produced in the 1600s before the Mizos entered Mizoram. The iptepui was popularised later outside of the limited wealthy elite in the 1700s. With the discovery of dyeing, the iptepui transformed into the iptechei. The iptechei was developed in the 18th century and was heavily embroidered.

== Dyes ==
Before dyeing their clothes, the Mizos discovered uses of paints for other purposes. The juice of the Beraw tree extracted by burning the tree and mixed with the juice of a Japanese varnish tree (meithui) produced a dye known as Japan varnish. Japan varnish was historically used on gunpowder containers. Paint was also utilised during festivals on faces using soot, coal dust, oil or juice of fruits such as strawberries. With the adoption of the cotton weaved clothes new sources of dyes were utilized.

White clothes were simply derived from cotton grown on their jhums when used in clothes. Black dye was found from the Assam Indigo plant known as ting (Strobilanthes cusia). The leaves of the plant were collected and pounded in a wooden trough. The leaves are boiled in water along with the threads to be dyed. Ashes are added and the threads are taken out of the dye to be left to soak in the sun. The threads are wrung out and left to dry in the sun up to three times to maintain the colour. Red dye was procured with the outer layer of certain plants which was also pounded and boiled alongside threads. Blue dye is achieved from boiling the zawngbin plant with ashes for some time. Brown clothes were simply produced via brown cotton. Yellow dyes were procured via turmeric roots, crushed and boiled with the thread.

After World War I, the return of Mizo servicemen in the labour corps saw the introduction of new dyes and colours in Mizo society. During World War Two, veterans would bring back dyeing soaps. Eventually, Mizo clothes became produced with synthetic dyes, and dye powder/soaps became obsolete.

== Sources ==
- Chatterji, N. (1978). Puan - The Pride of Mizoram. Aizawl: Firma KLM.
- Varsangzuali, Rosaline (2023). "Women's Fashion in Mizoram 1940-1960". In Hmingthanzuali; Vanlalthanpuii, Mary (eds.). The Keepers of Knowledge: Writings from Mizoram. New Delhi: Zubaan (published 2022). ISBN 978-93-90514-96-0.
- Lalbiakthanga (1978). The Mizos: A Study in Racial Personality. Guahati: United Publishers.
- Lalruatpuii, Esther; Miriami, H.; Ngurtinkhuma, Prof R.K (1 September 2022). "Library and Indigenous Knowledge of Mizo Traditional Weaving (with special reference to Puan having Geographical Identification Tag)". Library Philosophy and Practice.
- Lianhmingthanga (1998). Material Culture of the Mizo. Mizoram: Tribal Research Institute.
