= Azopardo Airport =

Airport in Chile

- IATA: none; ICAO: SCAZ

Summary
- Serves: Timaukel, Chile
- Elevation AMSL: 59 ft (18 m)
- Coordinates: 54°28′53″S 68°56′25″W

Map
- Location of Azopardo Airport in Chile

Runways
Direction	Length		Surface
Direction	m	ft	Surface
10/28	760	2,493	Grass
- Sources: Landings.com Google Maps GCM

Azopardo Airport Spanish: Aeropuerto Azopardo, (ICAO: SCAZ) is an airstrip serving the Timaukel commune in the Magallanes Region of Chile.

The airstrip is at the eastern end of the Almirantazgo Fjord, a fjord off the Strait of Magellan. The runway is alongside the Azopardo River, and there is mountainous terrain in all quadrants.

== See also ==
- Transport in Chile
- List of airports in Chile
