= ARA Azopardo (1884) =

History

Argentina
- Name: Azopardo
- Namesake: Juan Bautista Azopardo
- Builder: Stabilimento Tecnico Triestino, Trieste, Austria-Hungary
- Acquired: 1884
- Commissioned: 1885
- Decommissioned: 1922
- Stricken: 1922
- Home port: Buenos Aires; Ushuaia
- Fate: Sunk as target in 1924
- Notes: Sunk in accident with American Legion in Buenos Aires, 1922

General characteristics
- Type: Transport; later Tug
- Displacement: 383 tons
- Length: 43.50 m (142.7 ft)
- Beam: 7.2 m (23.6 ft)
- Draft: 2.43 m (8.0 ft)
- Installed power: 550 ihp (410 kW)
- Propulsion: 2-shaft, 2 × triple expansion steam engines; 2 boilers; 90 tons coal
- Speed: max 12 knots (14 mph; 22 km/h); cruise 10 knots (12 mph; 19 km/h)
- Range: 950 nautical miles
- Complement: 38 (3 officers)
- Armament: none as built
- Notes: Career and characteristics data from “Histarmar” website.

ARA Azopardo was a steam transport of the Argentine Navy, built in the Stabilimentó Tecnico Triestino and sold to Argentina in 1884. It was based. Among others, in the port of Buenos Aires and later Ushuaia, and was decommissioned in 1922 after being sunk in an accident; it was refloated and sunk in 1924 as a target. The vessel was named after the Juan Bautista Azopardo, a Maltese privateer and officer of the Argentine Navy during the Independence and Cisplatine wars, and was the first Argentine naval ship with this name.

== Design ==
Azopardo was a steam transport built in 1884 at the Stabilimento Tecnico Triestino, in Trieste, then part of Austria-Hungary. It had a single funnel and two simple masts, in ”pailebote” rigging.

It was powered by two triple expansion steam engines of 275 hp each, with two boilers, driving two 4-paddle propellers. It could carry 90 tons of coal, giving it a maximum range of 950 nautical miles.

Although unarmed as built, in 1891/2 was armed with 2 “Viejobueno” system 80mm iron guns, 2 Nordenfelt machine guns, and a 57mm Maxim (Note: Although the source indicates a 75mm Maxim gun on the bridge ((in Spanish) "... y un cañón de 75 mm. Maxim, éste último en el puente de navegación."), no reference to the existence of such a gun could be found; and does not concur with photographs. A typo error can explain “75” instead of “57”, a calibre used by Maxim-Nordenfelt.) gun.

== History ==
Azopardo was built in 1884 in Trieste, Austria Hungary, and sold to Argentina. It arrived in Buenos Aires in January 1885, and was commissioned in the Argentine Navy in March of the same year. Later that year carried President Julio Argentino Roca to Rosario, Santa Fe.

In 1888 it was refurbished, and then transferred to the newly created “Transport Division”, where it also acted in hydrographic survey tasks in addition to transporting cargo and passengers.

In 1890 Azopardo participated in the revolution of 1890, on the loyalist side. In 1893, when assigned to tasks in Patagonia supporting the Boundary Commission, it hit a rock and sunk in shallow water; being repaired onsite. In 1895 it was reclassified as “Aviso” and remained in Patagonia on hydrographic survey tasks, based at Ushuaia. In 1901 she was assigned to search and rescue tasks in Isla de los Estados. In August 1903 was wrecked in Cook Island, Isla de los Estados, and was assisted by the ARA Uruguay; it was later provisionally repaired and in September 1903 was able to return to Buenos Aires for thorough repairs and refurbishing.

From 1904 it was based in Buenos Aires, mostly in support and hydrographic survey duties. In 1918 was officially classified as hydrographic survey ship; it run aground in 1919 and 1920 suffering minor damage. In 1922 Azopardo was reclassified as tugboat, based at the port of Buenos Aires. On 5 August 1922 it was sunk as a result of a collision with the Mundson Line 22.000 ton steamship American Legion; in compensation Argentina received the transport ship América and the new tugboat Azopardo. The old transport-tug was raised and converted into a hulk;and was decommissioned in December 1922 (O.G. 211).

In 1923 she was converted in a target ship, being sunk in 1924 by fire of the Argentine battleships ARA Rivadavia and ARA Moreno, in front of Cape Corrientes, Mar del Plata.

== See also ==
- List of auxiliary ships of the Argentine Navy
