= ARA Azopardo (P-35) =

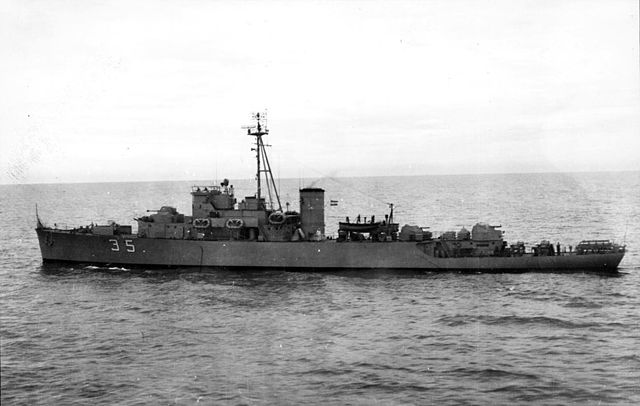
- ARA Azopardo underway

History

Argentina
- Name: Azopardo
- Namesake: Juan Bautista Azopardo, Argentine naval officer in the Independence and Cisplatine wars.
- Ordered: 1940
- Builder: AFNE Rio Santiago, Argentina
- Laid down: 1950
- Launched: 1953
- Completed: 1955
- Commissioned: 1955
- Decommissioned: 1972
- Fate: Scrapped

General characteristics
- Type: Azopardo class patrol boat
- Displacement: 1220 tons
- Length: 92.72 m (304.2 ft)
- Beam: 9.6 m (31.5 ft)
- Draft: 4 m (13 ft)
- Propulsion: 2-shaft, 2 × Parsons Steam turbines, 2 x Water-tube boilers, 5,000 ihp (3,700 kW), 340 tons oil
- Speed: 20 knots (23 mph; 37 km/h)
- Range: 2300 nautical miles @ ?kn
- Complement: 170
- Armament: 4 × 105-millimetre (4 in) L45 Bofors DP guns; 4 × 40 mm (1.6 in) Bofors AA guns; 4 × anti-submarine mortars

ARA Azopardo is a World War II era Argentine Navy warship, originally classified as patrol boat and later as antisubmarine frigate. The vessel is named after Juan Bautista Azopardo, an Argentine naval officer that served in both the Argentine War of Independence and in the Cisplatine War. It is the third Argentine naval ship with this name.

== Design ==
Azopardo was as part of a program to build four mine warfare ships during the Second World War, of which two (Murature and King) were completed as patrol boats and the others (Piedrabuena and Azopardo) as antisubmarine frigates.

== History ==
Azopardo was ordered in 1940, however significant delays caused its keel to be laid only in 1950; it was launched in 1953 and completed two years later.

Azopardo did not take part of the rising against Juan Domingo Perón's government known as Revolución Libertadora, as she was still being completed at Río Santiago.

Between 1956 and 1967 it belonged to the Destroyers and Frigates Squadron of the Seas Fleet based in Puerto Belgrano Naval Base, and participated in various exercises. Due to the Cruz del Sur incident, in 1967 she was deployed to Ushuaia.

From 1969 to 1972 she was assigned to training duties with the cadets of the Argentine Navy Academy. She was decommissioned in July 1972, and sold for scrapping to the company AYARSA in December 1972.

== See also ==
- List of ships of the Argentine Navy
- ARA Piedra Buena (P-36)
