= ARA Piedra Buena (P-36) =

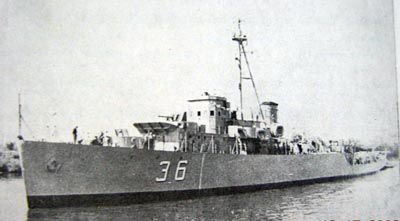
- ARA Piedra Buena underway

History

Argentina
- Name: Piedra Buena
- Namesake: Luis Piedrabuena, Argentine mariner and naval hero of the 19th century.
- Ordered: 1943
- Builder: AFNE Rio Santiago, Argentina
- Launched: 1954
- Completed: 1958
- Commissioned: 1958
- Decommissioned: 1972
- Fate: Scrapped

General characteristics
- Type: Azopardo class patrol boat
- Displacement: 1220 tons
- Length: 92.72 m (304.2 ft)
- Beam: 9.6 m (31.5 ft)
- Draft: 4 m (13 ft)
- Propulsion: 2-shaft, 2 × Parsons Steam turbines, 2 x Water-tube boilers, 5,000 ihp (3,700 kW), 340 tons oil
- Speed: 20 knots (23 mph; 37 km/h)
- Range: 2300 nautical miles @ ?kn
- Complement: 170
- Armament: 4 × 105-millimetre (4 in) L45 Bofors DP guns; 4 × 40 mm (1.6 in) Bofors AA guns; 4 × anti-submarine mortars

ARA Piedra Buena is a World War II era Argentine Navy warship, originally classified as patrol boat and later as antisubmarine frigate. The vessel is named after Luis Piedrabuena, an Argentine mariner (later naval officer) that explored and guarded Argentine sovereignty in Patagonia. It is the third Argentine naval ship with this name.

== Design ==
Piedra Buena was as part of a program to build four mine warfare and patrol ships during the Second World War, of which two (Murature and King) were completed as patrol boats and the others (Piedrabuena and Azopardo) as antisubmarine frigates.

== History ==
Piedra Buena was ordered in 1943, however significant delays caused it to be launched in 1954 and completed four years later. Initially she was named Piedrabuena by decree 23.388/49 and classified as a patrol ship, however her name was amended to Piedra Buena and reclassified as a frigate by decree 11.373/58.

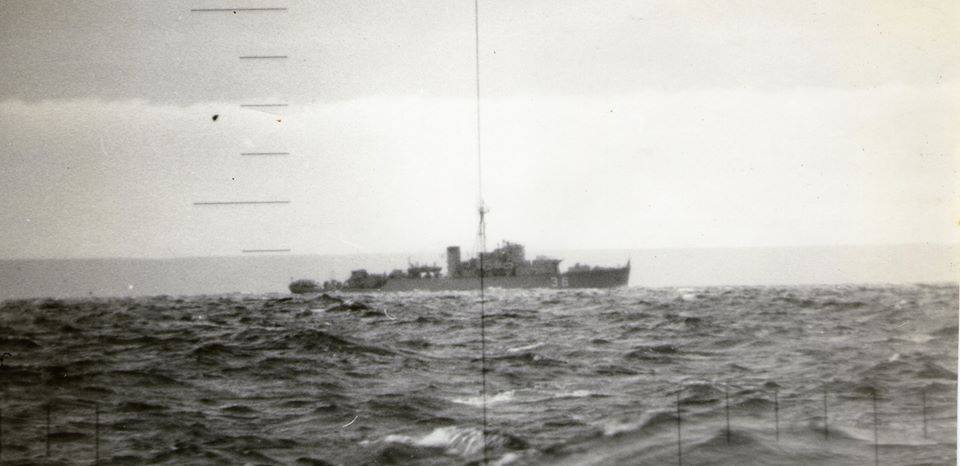
Piedra Buena seen through the attack periscope of ARA Santiago del Estero (S-12) during naval exercises

Between 1959 and 1968 she belonged to the Destroyers and Frigates Squadron of the High Seas Fleet based in Puerto Belgrano Naval Base; and she participated in various naval exercises, including UNITAS I (1960), UNITAS II (1961), UNITAS III (1962), UNITAS IV (1963), and ATLANTIS I (1968).

From 1969 to 1972 Piedra Buena was assigned to training duties with the cadets of the Argentine Navy Academy; in 1971 she suffered a fire in the engine room.

She was decommissioned in July 1972, and sold for scrapping to the company AYARSA in December 1972.

== See also ==
- List of ships of the Argentine Navy
- ARA Azopardo (P-35)
