= ARA Murature (P-20) =

Argentine Navy warship

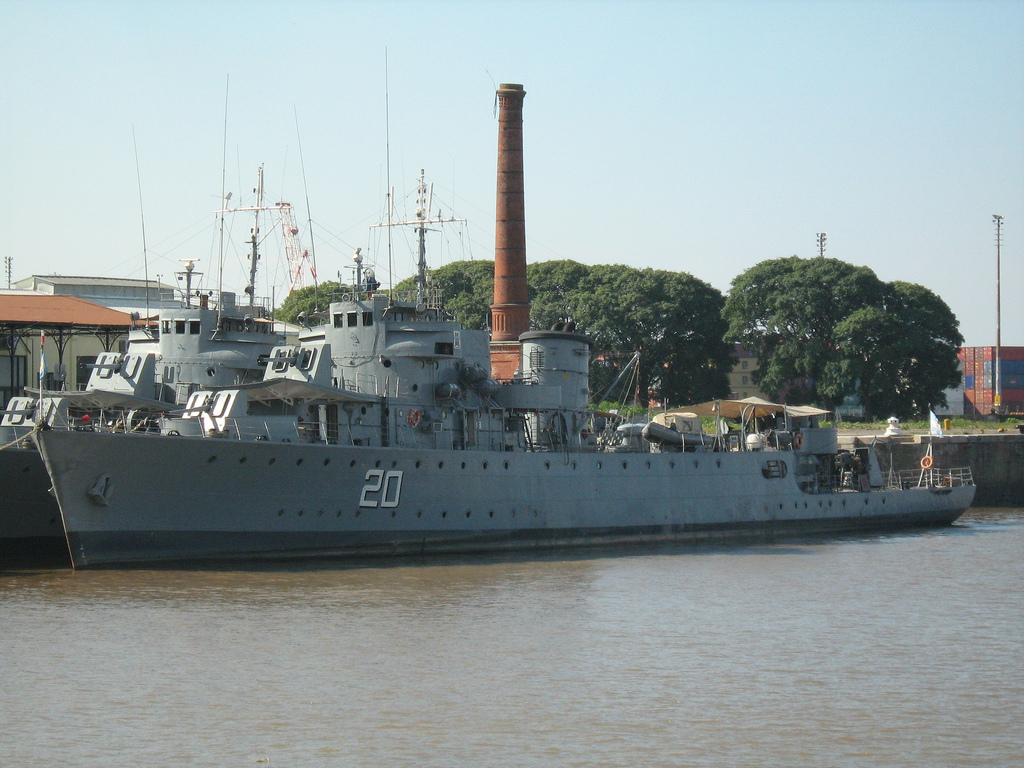
- ARA Murature (P-20) in 2010

History

Argentina
- Name: Murature
- Namesake: After José Luis Murature
- Builder: AFNE Rio Santiago
- Launched: 1944
- Commissioned: 5 July 1945
- Home port: Buenos Aires naval base
- Fate: Decommissioned 2014 and scrapped 2015

General characteristics
- Class & type: Murature class patrol boat
- Displacement: 1,032 tons
- Length: 78.41 m (257.3 ft)
- Beam: 9 m (30 ft)
- Draught: 4.14 m (13.6 ft)
- Propulsion: 2 × Werkspoor Diesel
- Speed: 18 knots (33 km/h)
- Complement: 130
- Sensors & processing systems: Decca TM-1226 radar
- Armament: 3 × 105mm L45 Bofors DP; 4 × 40mm AA Bofors; 5 × 12,7mm machine guns

Murature was a 900-ton World War II era Argentine Navy warship, originally classified as minelayer and later as patrol boat. The vessel was named after José Luis Murature, Foreign Minister of Argentina from 1916 to 1918.

== History ==
Murature was laid down in 1944 and commissioned in 1945. She took part of the 1955 rising against Juan Domingo Perón's government known as Revolución Libertadora, when she shot down a government Avro Lincoln bomber over the Rio de la Plata during the evacuation of the rebel naval base at Río Santiago.

According to capitán de navio (R) Benjamín Cosentino who acted as anti-submarine advisor to the Officer in Tactical Command, Argentine Destroyer Force in February 1960, he was sent to the School of Naval Warfare that month to write the final report on the 1960 Golfo Nuevo incident for the Argentine Naval General Staff. In this incident, one or possibly two intruder submarines of unknown flag were present in Golfo Nuevo, Chubut Province, between the period 31 January and 17 February 1960 and eluded or survived all attempts to sink them. One or other of the patrol boats Murature and King were involved in all six depth-charge or gunnery attacks along the coastal shallows: Murature on 4th, 7th (evening), 11th and in company with King on 16 February 1960: King on 5th, 7th (morning) and along with Murature on 16 February 1960.

Along with her sister ship ARA King, Murature was the oldest unit still in service in the Argentine navy as of 2014. She was decommissioned and scrapped the following year.
