= Río Santiago Shipyard =

Shipyard in Ensenada, Buenos Aires Province, Argentina

Coordinates: 34.84816°S 57.89944°W

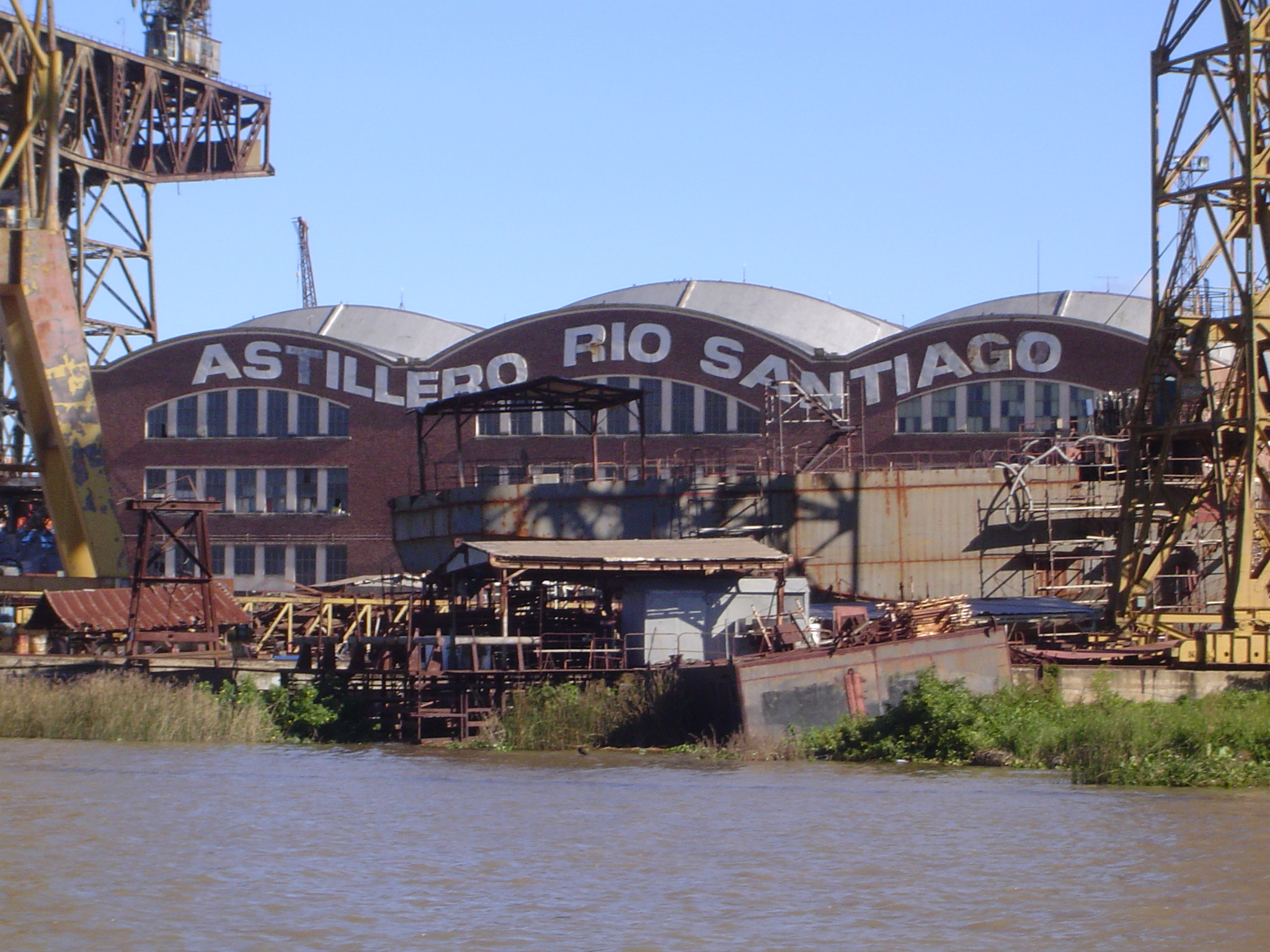
- View of the shipyard from the Santiago River.
- Native name: Astillero Río Santiago
- Industry: Ship transport, Rail transport
- Founded: 1953; 73 years ago in Ensenada
- Headquarters: Ensenada, Argentina
- Products: Merchant vessels, Warships, Rolling stock
- Owner: Government of Buenos Aires Province
- Number of employees: 3,600 (2014)
- Divisions: Industrial; Transport; Merchancy
- Website: astillero.gba.gov.ar

The Río Santiago Shipyard is a shipyard located in the city of Ensenada, Buenos Aires Province at the shores of the Santiago River. Currently owned by the Government of Buenos Aires Province, it has been one of the major active and important shipyards in Latin America. Founded in 1953, it has realized diverse functions in the naval, industrial and railroad sectors. In its golden age the shipyard reached 8,000 workers on double shift. In 2008 relies on 2,700 workers.

The most famous work was the construction, in 1962, of the Fragata Libertad. In 1966 this vessel obtained the world speed record in sailing on its voyage across the North Atlantic, covering a distance of 2,058.6 nautical miles (3,812.5 km) in 8 days and 12 hours. The race began in Cape Race, Canada and ended at an imaginary line set between Dublin and Liverpool.

== Organization ==
It has a Technical management staff that operates by departments which manage the different areas of work, such as preparing ships, armament, electricity, planning of water ways, machinery, structure, basic projects, etcetera. It also has a Department of Quality Control that verifies that works stay within the International Norms and Registries.

It has a Technical management staff that operates by departments which manage the different areas of work, such as preparing ships, armament, electricity, planning of water ways, machinery, structure, basic projects, etcetera. It also has a Department of Quality Control that verifies that works stay within the International Norms and Registries.

== History ==
The Río Santiago Shipyard started its activities on June 15 of 1953, by the Decree N° 10.627 that established the creation of "Astilleros y Fábricas Navales del Estado (AFNE)", a company integrated by the "Astillero Río Santiago (ARS)" and by the "Fábrica Naval de Explosivos Azul (FANAZUL)", dependent of the Admiralty (Spanish: "Ministerio de Marina").

When the construction was completed, the Río Santiago Shipyard had many workshops that produced essential elements. These include a machine shop for bolts and adjustments, furnaces for iron and copper, electronics, and sections for carpentry and paint.

It had a sustained growth during its first years. In 1969 it modified its legal status and became a State Anonymous Society. Between 1970 and 1976, the shipyard signed and started the construction of five cargo ships each of 9,000 tons built for the Empresa Líneas Marítimas Argentinas (ELMA), two tankers of 60,000 tons each for YPF, two bulk-carriers with 23,700 tons of displacement and four cargo ships with 14,450 tons of displacement, also for ELMA.

It constructed diesel motors and cranes for its ships and other shipyards and train motors for Ferrocarriles Argentinos (the State-owned rail transport company of Argentina). It also constructed elements for hydraulic turbines, nuclear components (through a license with Atomic Energy of Canada), and bogies for railroads (through a license with American Steel Foundry).

In the mid-1970s it employed approximately 5,500 employees and nearly 3,000 employees hired by distant client companies that directly affected production.

This factory, the largest in Argentina, suffered its worst crisis in the 1990s when it almost became private, finally ending up as a part of the Buenos Aires province.

=== In the 21st century ===
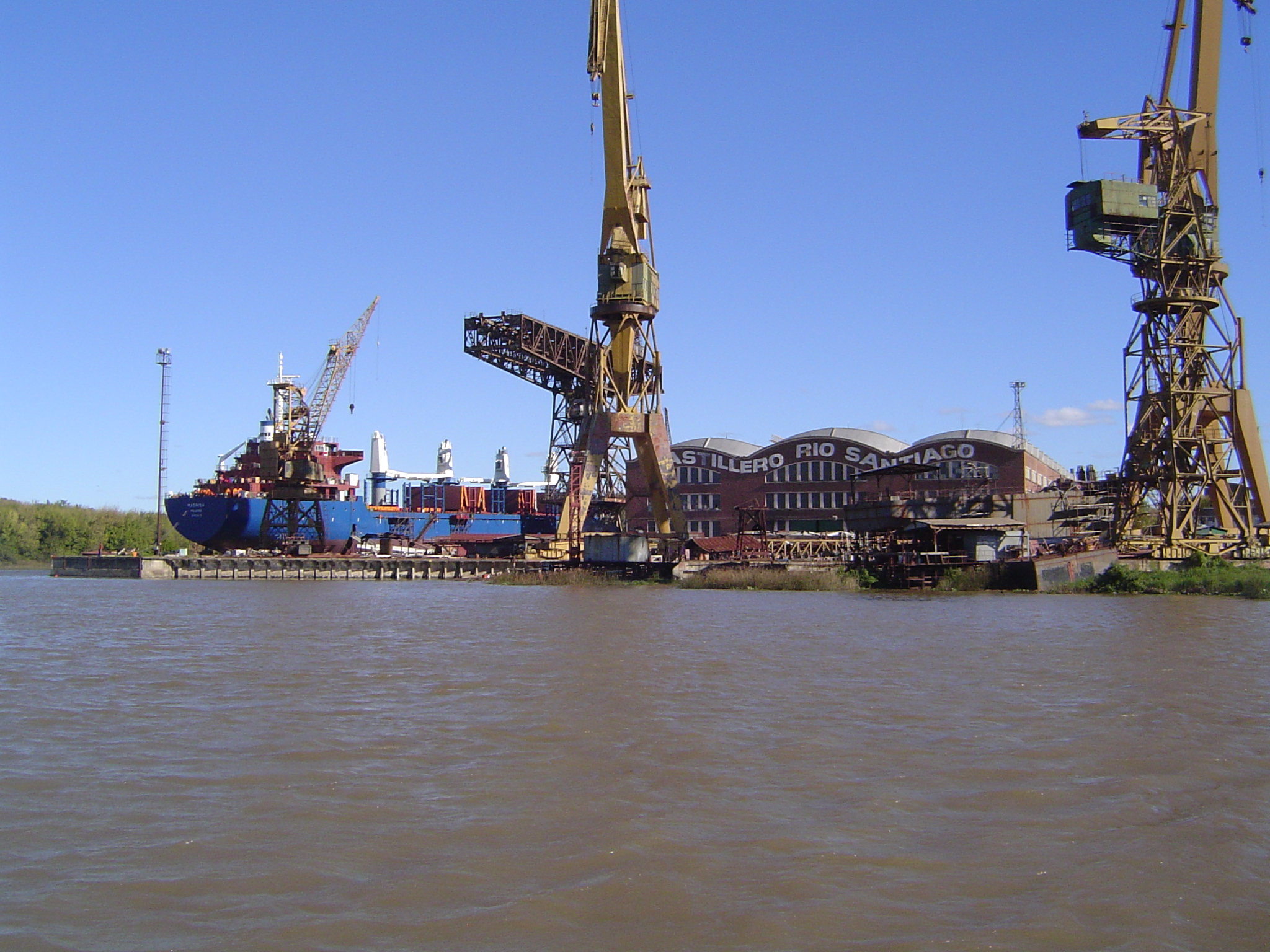
Shipyard seen from river Santiago, April 2006

After suffering the third change of direction in two years, the Río Santiago Shipyard was back to work at full capacity for the first time in two decades. After president of Venezuela Hugo Chávez visited the shipyard in 2005, both governments signed contracts to provide eight tanks for the Venezuelan oil company. Construction of the first block of the "Eva Perón" started on 18 January, one of the two platforms being built for PDVSA. Nevertheless, by 2015 only one of those eight ships had been built, but they were never inaugurated.

In March 2006, the "Madrisa" was launched, a cargo ship, technically called bulk carrier, built for a German customer. The shipyard had been given offers to build oil platforms that will require, in case the job was acquired, that it shared part of the work with another shipyard that was currently closed. The Corrientes Shipyard was being kept in mind for this job, since it already has experience building offshore platforms for Thailand.

In September 2010, signed a preliminary agreement with Ukrainian shipyard Chernomorsky Shipbuilding in order to gain experience in the construction of ice class ships.

In November 2015 it was announced that the ARS shipyard will build 2 small ships for the Argentine Navy, the first ones after 32 years. The design, named LICA ((in Spanish) Lancha de Instrucción de Cadetes de la Armada) was developed by the shipyard's engineering team. It was expected that construction will start in early 2016.

In August 2018, the company suffered multiple dismissals and, faced with the possible closure of the Río Santiago Shipyard plant, the workers mobilized in the city of La Plata to defend their jobs. The response of the provincial government, was the repression with rubber bullets and tear gas that caused serious incidents, registering several injured people.

== Location ==
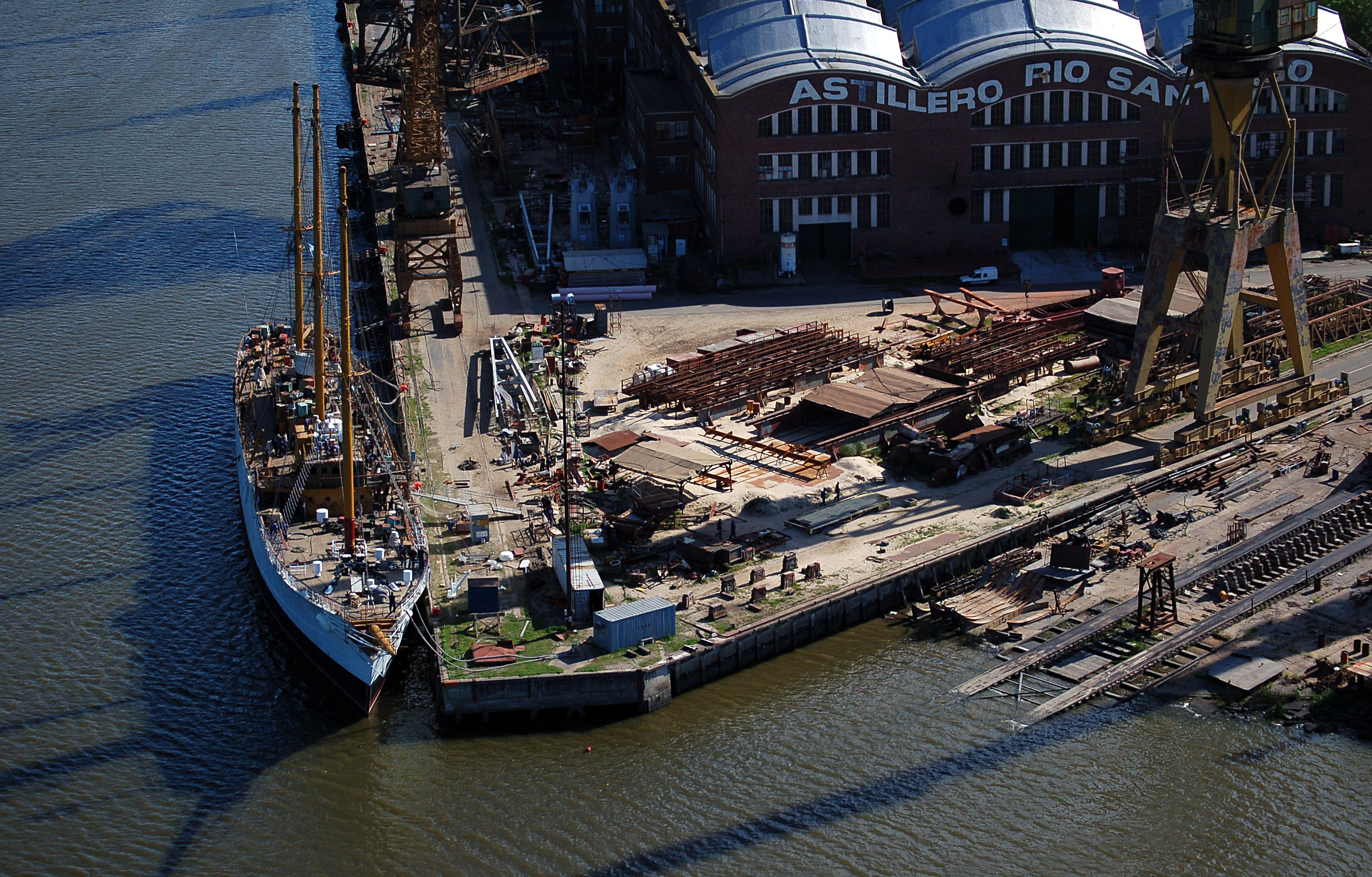
Aerial view of the shipyard, 2006

The shipyard is situated in the city of Ensenada, Argentina at the shores of the Santiago River, in front of the Escuela Naval Militar (Military Naval School). The Río Santiago Shipyard's area is 229 hectares and 55 acres (220,000 m^{2}), but the surface area affected by the industrial work is approximately 100 hectares. The buildings used to be united by a series of tunnels for the electric, water vapor, and compressed air feeders, which reach a length of more than five kilometers.

The holding beaches for materials and parking lots are covered with asphalt covering a surface area of 40,000 square meters, and the internal streets of the shipyard are also covered in asphalt totaling 70,000 square meters. It also has seven kilometers of internal railroads that connect with the Ensenada city branch.

== Main products ==
=== Warships ===
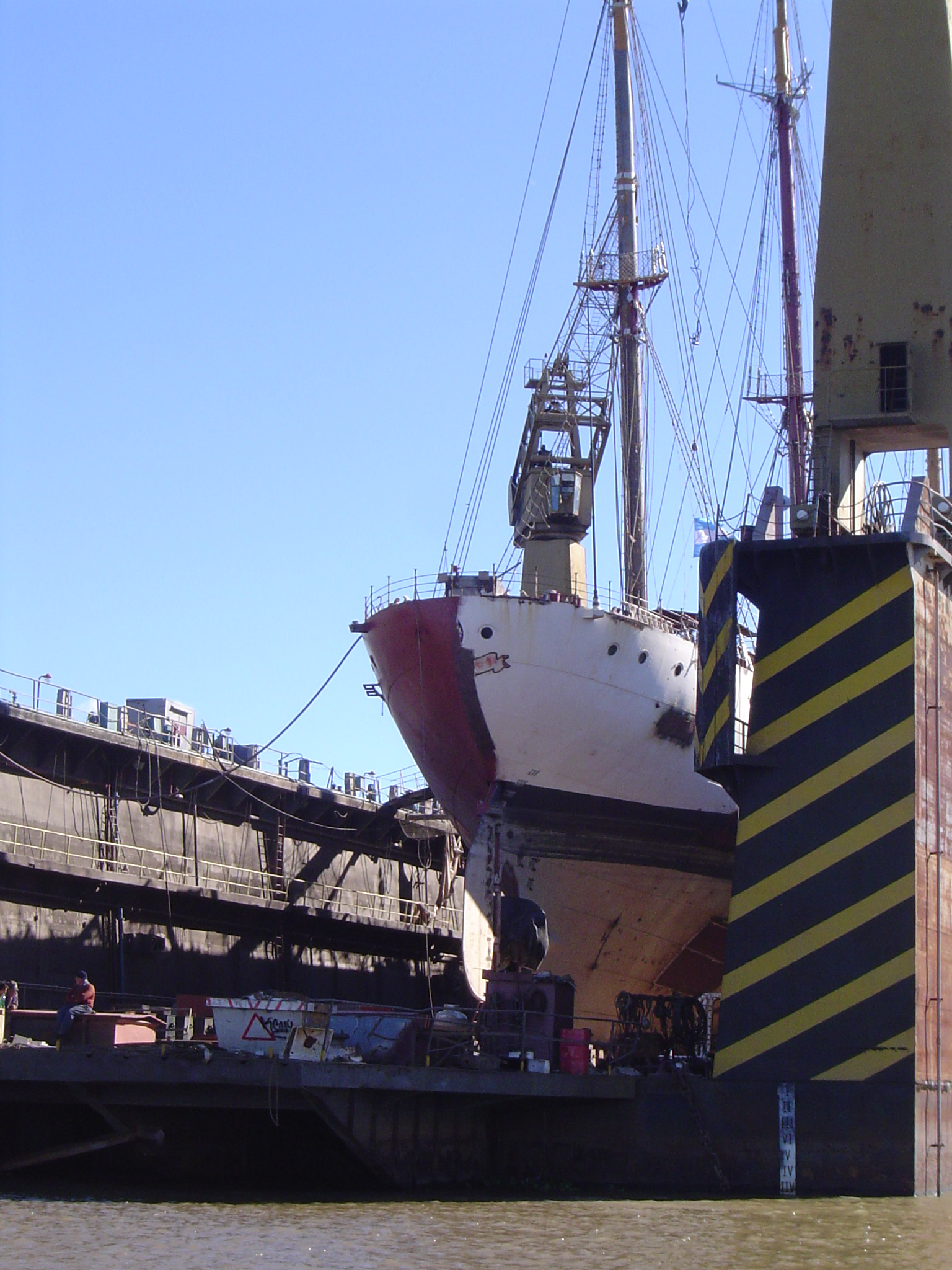
Sail ship Libertad, during mid-life refurbishing at the Río Santiago Shipyard, April 2006

- Azopardo class frigates (2)
- Patrol ships ARA King and ARA Murature
- Landing ship B.D.T. ARA Cabo San Antonio
- Destroyer Type 42 ARA Santísima Trinidad
- Corvettes Type MEKO 140 (6)

=== Merchant Ships ===
- Multipurpose Ships
- Product Holding Ships
- Container Ships
- Grain Ships

=== Smaller ships ===
- Fishing boat type ARS LPA-720 (2 man craft)
- Naval Service Patrol (6 man craft)
- Hydrographic research boat ARA Cormorán (1964)

=== Sail training ship ===
The frigate ARA Libertad (Q-2) was the third ship built by the shipyard; delivered to the Argentine Navy in 1962, she made her first voyage in 1963. Since its commission she covered more than 800,000 nautical miles (1,500,000 km) around the world and spent about 17 years at sea. She has been used for training for nearly 11,000 officers of the Argentine Navy.

== See also ==
- ARA Libertad (Q-2)
- List of shipyards of Argentina
