= José Luis Murature =

Argentine lawyer, journalist, professor and foreign minister

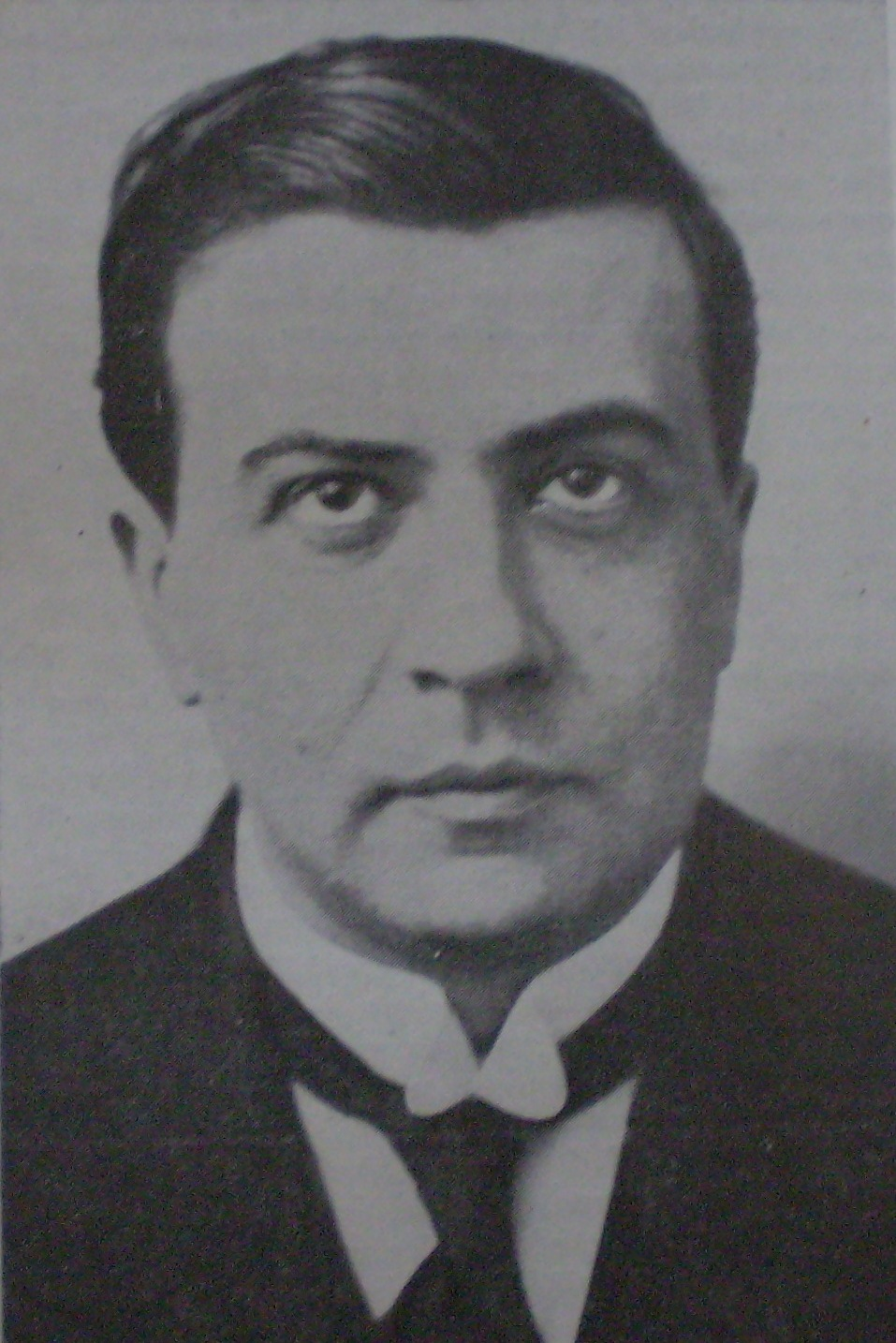
José Luis Murature.

José Luis Murature (27 January 1876 – 15 September 1929) was an Argentine lawyer, journalist, professor and foreign minister of Argentina from 1914 to 1916.

Born in Buenos Aires, the son of José P. Murature and Dolores Legarrete, he was educated at the Colegio Nacional de Buenos Aires and the University of Buenos Aires. Murature was awarded the degree of Doctor of Laws in 1898. He was later a member of the staff of La Nación newspaper in Buenos Aires, rising to Managing Editor.

Murature taught in the Military School, where he held the professorship from 1905 to 1914, and from 1914 to 1916, he acted as the Foreign Minister of Argentina. He died in Hamburg, Germany, on 15 September 1929.
