= Juan Bautista Azopardo =

Maltese privateer

Juan Bautista Azopardo (Maltese: Ġann Patist Azzopardi)
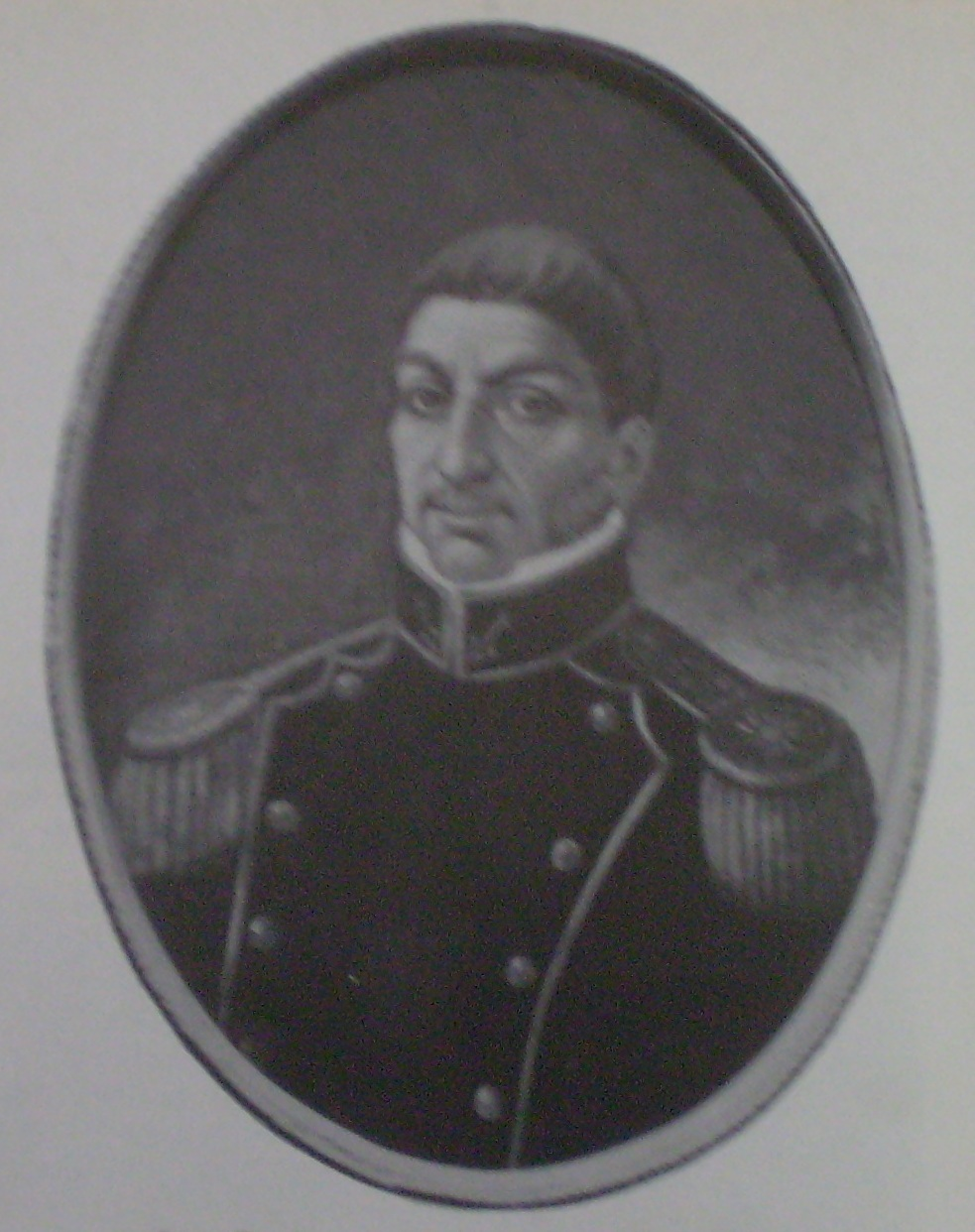
- Juan Bautista Azopardo, Naval Museum - Tigre
- Born: 19 February 1772; Senglea, Hospitaller Malta
- Died: 23 October 1848 (aged 76); Buenos Aires
- Military career
- Allegiance: Argentina
- Branch: Argentine Navy
- Service years: 1804 - 1827
- Rank: Colonel
- Conflicts: British invasions of the River Plate; Argentine War of Independence; Cisplatine War

Juan Bautista Azopardo (Maltese: Ġann Patist Azzopardi; 19 February 1772 – 23 October 1848) was a Maltese privateer and military man who fought under the flags of the Netherlands, Spain, and Argentina.

== Early life ==
Juan Bautista Azopardo was born in Senglea, Malta, the son of Rosina (née Romano) and Salvatore Azopardo. As a young man he studied naval architecture at the French arsenal in Toulon.

== Privateer ==
Azopardo served with the French and the British fleets, the latter under the command of Admiral John Jervis. He captained the tartanes San Antonio and Anime del Porgatorio. He later served as a privateer with a Letter of marque from the Netherlands, and then with a letter of marque from Spain against England.

Azopardo arrived in the Río de La Plata area in the first years of the 19th century.

During the war between England and the Batavian Republic (the Netherlands), he served on the schooner De Hoop and took part in the capture of the ship Neptune. Neptune arrived at the port of Montevideo as a prize on 21 January 1804; she was carrying 256 slaves. The prize master was the Frenchman Hipólite Mordeille. (Note: Neptune, of 343 tons (bm), was under the command of James Phillips. She had sailed from England on 21 July 1803. British records indicate that she had embarked 357 slaves and had arrived at Montevideo with 349. As of February 2023, the reason for the discrepancy in the number of slaves is obscure.)

Next, Azopardo served as second in command of the privateer Dromedario. Dromedario, with Mordeille, master, sailed with a letter of marque from Montevideo. She was armed with 22 guns and had a crew of 350 men under the command of Hipólito Mordeille, with Azorpardo as second captain.

Spanish records report that in June 1805, Viceroy Sobremonte issued two letters of marque, one for Dolores (24 guns), Currand, master, and Berro y Errasquin, owner, and one for Dromedario (20 guns), Hippolito Mordel, master, and Canuerso y Masini, owner. The two sailed for the African coast, looking to capture enslaving ships. In three months of cruising Dolores captured three ships and one brig, carrying a total 600 enslaved people. Dromedario captured five ships, carrying a total of 500 enslaved people.

=== British Invasions of Buenos Aires (1806 - 1807) ===
The ship Dromedario transported some of the troops which fought against the first British Invasion (1806) of Buenos Aires. Along with his captain and the rest of the Dromedario crew, they fought in the final assault on the British position in Buenos Aires where the remnants of the British forces under general Beresford were. During the second British invasion (1807) of Buenos Aires they transported artillery pieces on the Paraná River for the city's defense. For his valor and gallantry, the Spanish Royal government made him a Lieutenant Colonel of the urban militias.

After the surrender of Beresford's army, the Royal Navy enforced a blockade on the River Plate. This moved the Viceroyalty authorities to resort to privateers in order to harass British shipping. On 17 November 1806, in Buenos Aires, Santiago de Liniers gave him a letter of marque for La Mosca de Buenos Aires, of four guns and 60 men, built by Anselmo Saénz Valiente.

On 1 June 1807, the Mosca de Buenos Aires outran the brigs HMS Staunch and Protector as they chased her upriver. Later, two boats from the British warships attempted to seize Mosca de Buenos Aires in shallow waters. They failed, although they did manage to capture a Spanish sloop.

The letter of marque expired in 1808 whereupon Azopardo retired from privateering for the Spanish crown.

== Argentine service ==
=== War of independence ===
Azopardo joined the revolutionary forces on the May Revolution of 1810. He was given back the rank the Spanish viceroy had taken from him.

After the poor results of the Paraguay campaign, Manuel Belgrano requested reinforcements from Buenos Aires in order to maintain his fight in the region. The Junta could not send them by land through Entre Ríos Province, as the rivers were controlled by the royalist navy under Gaspar de Vigodet. At the end of 1810 the government gave Lieutenant Colonel Azopardo, command of the first national navy, comprising three vessels, whose mission was to protect the advance of the reinforcements to Belgrano's force. The ships of this small squadron were the schooner Invencible, the brigantine 25 de Mayo and the sloop América. His second in command was captain Hipólito Bouchard.

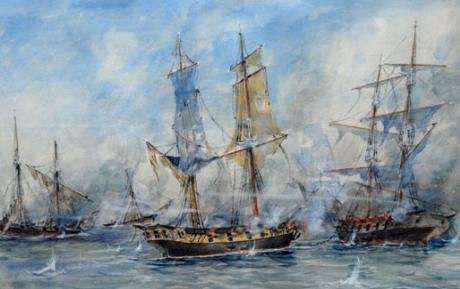
Battle of San Nicolás.

At the Battle of San Nicolás, on 2 March 1811, he was forced to confront a superior royalist navy with seven ships to his three. Azopardo was wounded and made prisoner, with his ships being captured. Belgrano would have to do without reinforcements and be forced to sign a document abandoning Paraguay.

Imprisoned by the Spaniards, Azopardo was moved to Ceuta, where he shared a prison cell with the Inca Juan Bautista Túpac Amaru. The revolution of General Riego (1820) ended with the liberals taking power in Spain, and ordering the freedom of all political prisoners. Azopardo returned to Argentina, where he was received as a hero. He was given the post of Buenos Aires Harbor Master.

=== War with Brazil ===
Returning to Buenos Aires he was given command of the brigantine General Belgrano, as second in command to admiral Guillermo Brown, to fight against the naval forces of Pedro I of Brazil, who had declared war on Argentina at the end of 1825.

=== Final service ===
He returned to the post of Buenos Aires Harbor Master until 1826. On 3 February 1827 he requested and obtained his retirement.

== Last years ==
He spent his last years with his wife Maria Sandalia Perez Rico and his son Luis Alberto. Juan Bautista Azopardo died on 23 October 1848 in Buenos Aires.

== Legacy and honors ==
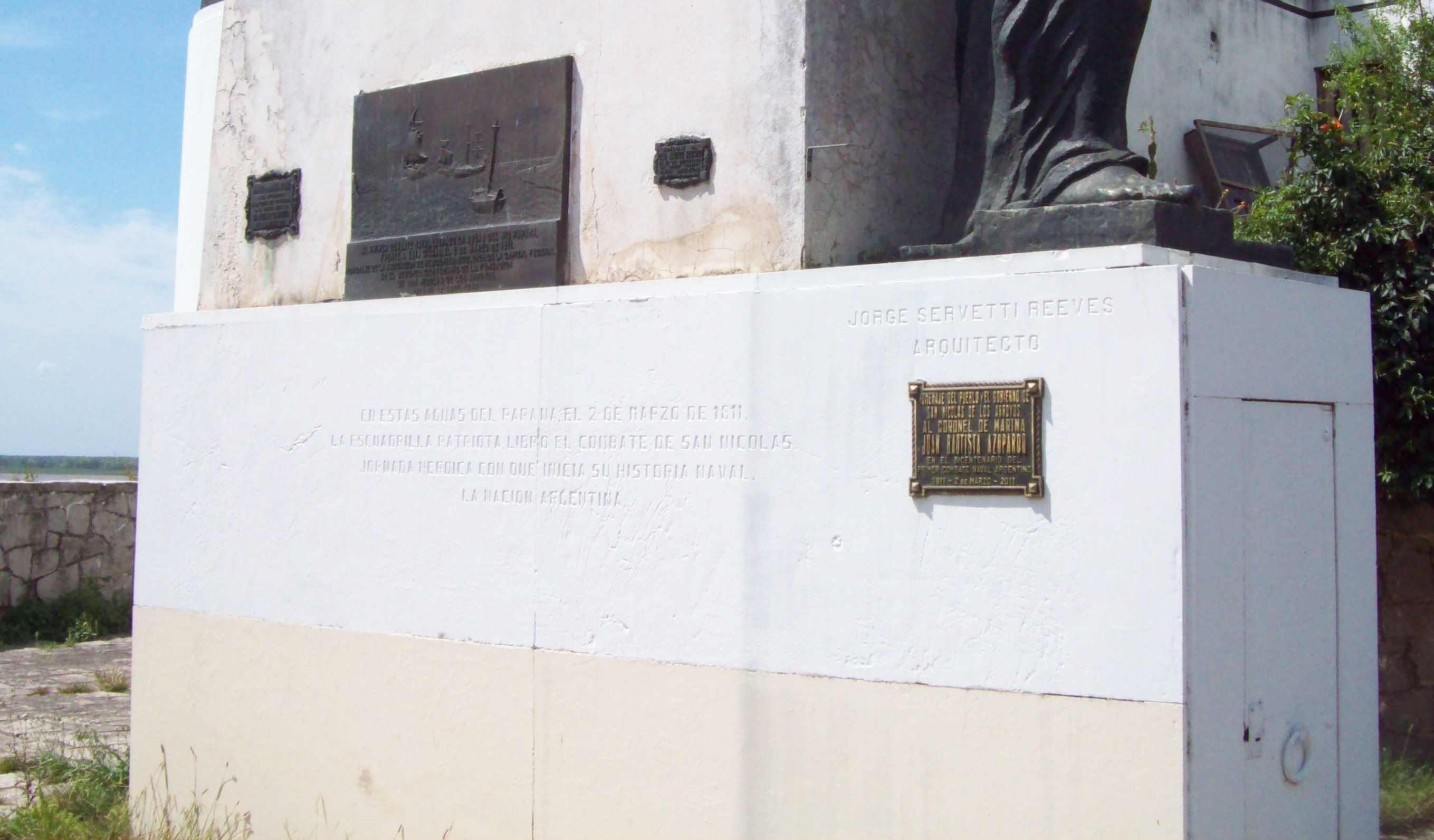
Monument to Azopardo (detail) in San Nicolás de los Arroyos

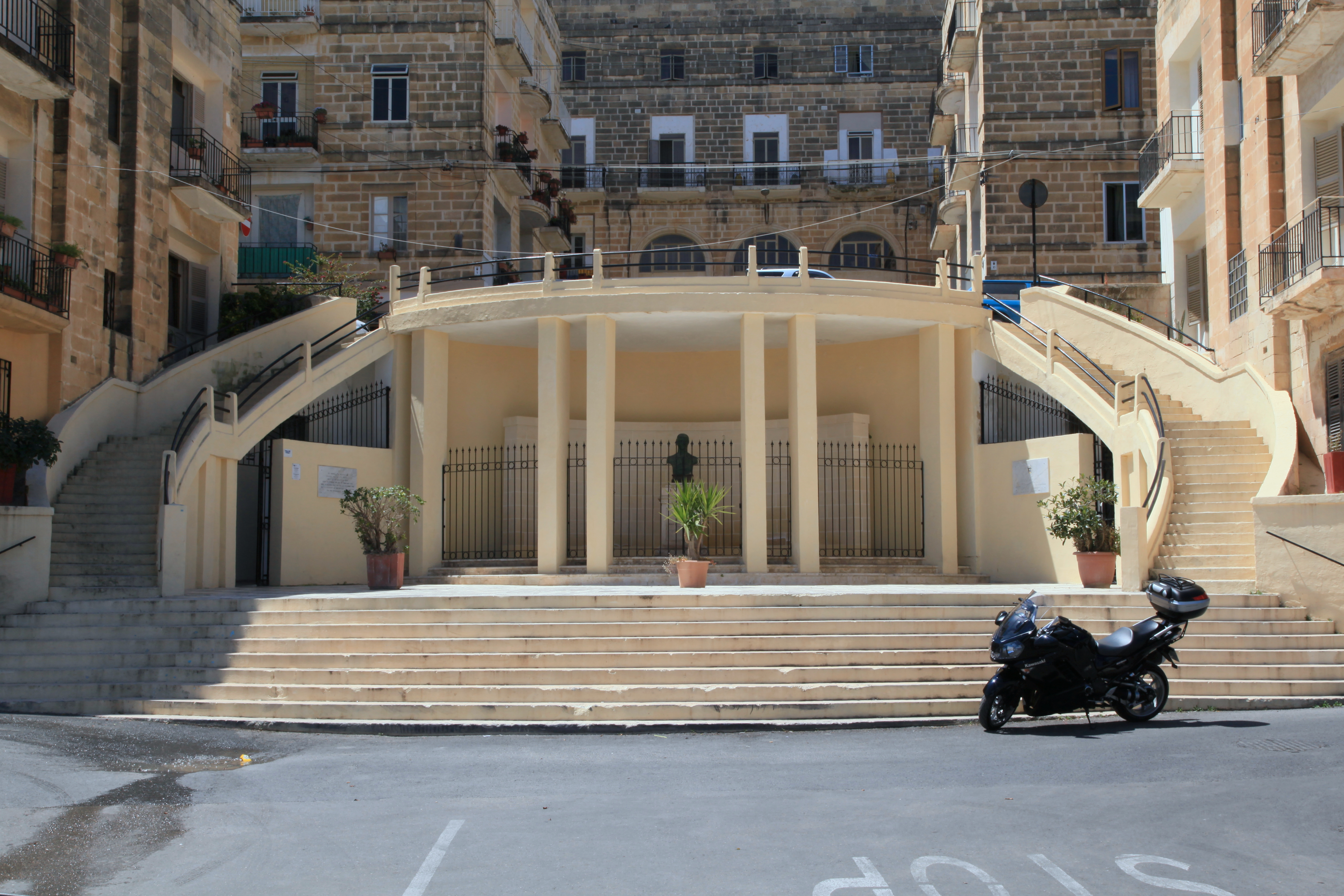
Monument to Azopardo in his hometown Senglea

=== Azopardo Monument ===
In the city of San Nicolás de los Arroyos, an obelisk with a height of 26 metres (85 ft), covered in marble, was made with federal funds to pay homage to the Naval Battle of San Nicolás. Azopardo's remains are buried there.

=== Other memorials ===
Argentina

- Several vessels of the Argentine Navy and Argentine Coast Guard carried his name: Transport / Tug Boat (1884), Tug Boat (1923), Frigate (1955), Coast Guard Cutter (1962), Coast Guard Cutter GC-25 (1983).
- A naval base ((in Spanish) Arsenal Naval Azopardo) in Azul, Buenos Aires province, is named after him.
- A street in Buenos Aires is named after him.
- Several schools in Argentina are named Azopardo.
- Azopardo Point, in Santa Cruz Province, Argentina.
  - Azopardo Lighthouse, in Azopardo Point, Santa Cruz, Argentina.
- Azopardo Rock, in Chubut Province, Argentina.

Malta

- On 16 June 2001 a bust commemorating Azopardo was unveiled on Senglea's waterfront.
- Part of the Senglea Marina was also named after him.
- In commemoration of the 175th death anniversary of Azopardo, the Central Bank of Malta issued a silver coin, with a denomination of 10 Euro in 2023.

== See also ==
- Azopardo biography in his native city's website
- (in Spanish) Azopardo biography at Argentina's Navy website

== See also ==
- Azopardo, Mercedes G. (1963). "Coronel de Marina Juan Bautista Azopardo". In Piccirilli, Ricardo; Gianello, Leoncio (eds.). Biografías Navales Argentinas. Secretaría de Estado de Marina.
- Darmanin, Denis A. (20 October 1995). "'The Gallant officer - turned rebel' Part 1". Malta Independent.
- Darmanin, Denis A. (27 October 1995). "V". Malta Independent.
