= Estelle (given name) =

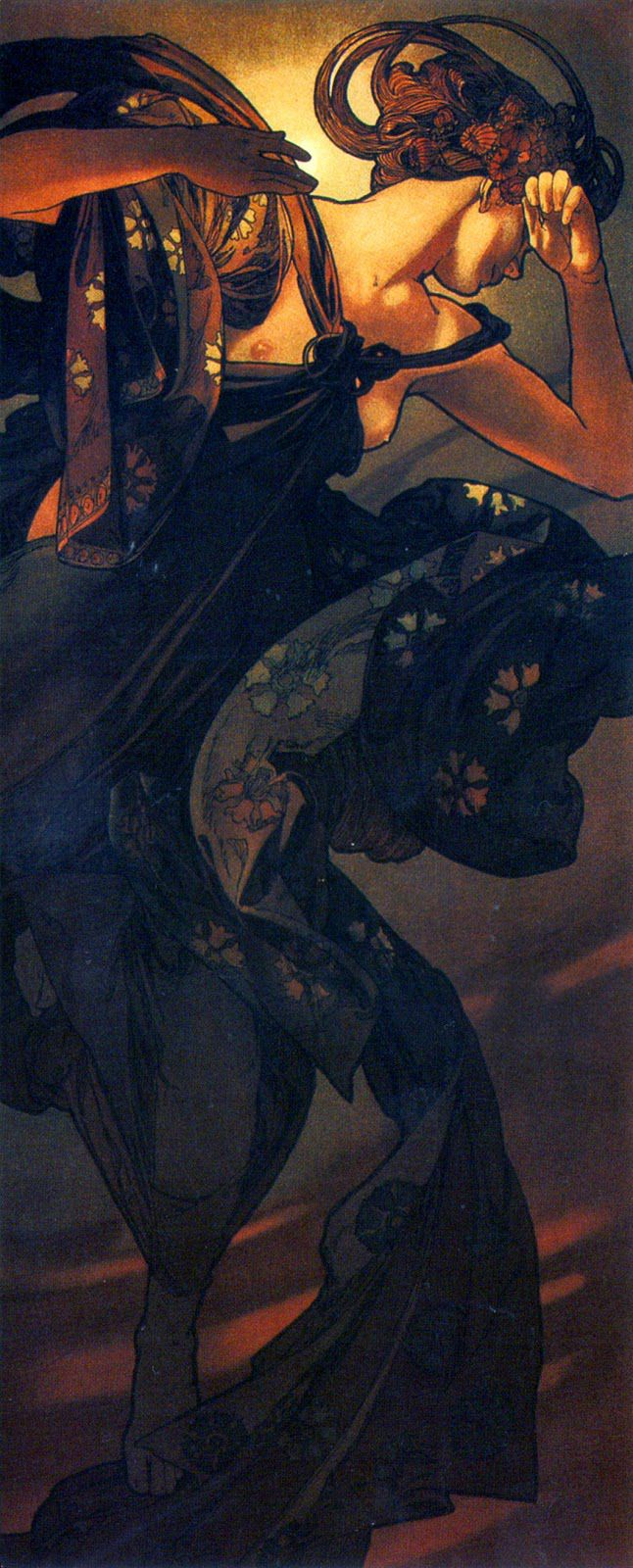
- The Evening Star, part of a 1902 Art Nouveau decorative panel by Alfons Mucha.
- Gender: female

Origin
- Origin: Latin, Occitan, French
- Meaning: star

Other names
- Related names: Stella, Estella, Esther

Estelle is a female name of Occitan origin, and means star.

Saint Estelle was a martyr who purportedly lived in Aquitania in the third century AD, although the earliest references to her date from the Middle Ages. The earliest formats of this Saint's name, Eustella/Eustelle and Eustalia, morphed into Estelle by Provençal poet Frédéric Mistral due to association with estela (the Occitan word meaning "star", of which Estelle is essentially a phonetic rendering in French). Saint Estelle is the patron saint of the Felibrige, a literary and cultural association founded by Mistral and other Provençal writers to defend and promote their language.

Star is the meaning generally assigned to the name Estelle, due to it being a French rendering of the Occitan word estela. However, the format Eustalia suggests the name could originate from the Greek word eustales, meaning "well-equipped." Despite the reported popularity of the saint the name Estelle was afforded little evident usage prior to the publication in 1788 of the pastoral Estelle by Jean-Pierre Claris de Florian, the first famous historical namesake, Estelle Fornier (née Dubœuf), muse of the composer Berlioz, who was born in 1797. Best-known overall in France due to model Estelle Lefébure (born 1966), the name Estelle has proven substantially more popular in Belgium than France.

Estelle came into vogue in the British Isles in the mid-19th century likely as a variant of the similar Stella which had recently become fashionable. Estelle was also promoted via utilization by a number of novelists who wrote in English, most notably Charles Dickens in variant form for the character Estella Havisham in his novel Great Expectations published in August 1861 after being serialized weekly from December 1860 with Estella being introduced in Chapter 8 on 19 January 1861. The general scholarly consensus is that in choosing Estella as the name of the remote love object of his novel's focal character: Pip - whose full given name is Philip - Dickens was evoking Sir Philip Sidney's poetic wooing of the unattainable Stella in Astrophel and Stella (1591). Several other widely read authors of the day gave the name Estelle to major characters in their novels, Catherine Gore in Romances of Real Life as early as 1829 although most examples date from mid-century, such as Annie Edwards in Creeds (1859), E.D.E.N. Southworth in The Lady of the Isle (1859), and Augusta Jane Evans in St. Elmo (1866).

Estelle and Estella remained popular from roughly 1880 to 1930, with a marked decline in usage since 1960. Estelle has overall been more popular in the United States than in the British Isles, with there being at least two prominent American namesakes: writer Estelle Anna Lewis (1824–1880) and society woman Estelle Skidmore Doremus (1830–1905), who significantly predate the name's mid-19th century British vogue (although in Lewis' case it is dubious if Estelle were her birth name rather than a literary affectation).

Estelle is also used as an alternative form of Esther.

Footnote
The newborn Princess' parents Crown Princess Victoria and her husband Prince Daniel chose their daughter's names in consultation with King Carl Gustaf: in announcing the Princess' given name the King termed Estelle "a name which is very close to the heart of the Princess [Victoria] and also the family." It was widely speculated that to honor World War II hero Count Folke Bernadotte - great-great-uncle and godfather to King Carl Gustaf - the newborn Princess was named after the Count's wife: the former Estelle Manville of Westchester County, New York, an idea endorsed by Elisabeth Tarras-Wahlberg, longtime Stockholm Palace spokeswoman: (quote) "The Crown Princess was always interested in matters relating to ending conflict...Folke Bernadotte in that area was a pioneer." However this has not been confirmed by any member of the Swedish Royal Family.

The name Estelle made headlines in February 2012 when King Carl Gustaf of Sweden announced Estelle as the given name chosen for his newborn granddaughter (see Princess Estelle, Duchess of Östergötland). The choice of a French name with only a peripheral profile in Sweden - a 2012 year-end tally would estimate that a total of 663 Swedish residents bore the given name Estelle - touched off a flurry of media debate with writer Herman Lindqvist, who has acted as a historical consultant to the Swedish Royal Family, expressing the extreme negative position thus: "Totally unexpected and inappropriate...No name for a future ruler...Estelle sounds like the name of a nightclub queen." Conversely top Scandinavian royalty pundit Kjell Arne Totland (no) reacted positively, calling Estelle "a very nice name, rich in tradition yet modern."

== People with the name Estelle ==
- Princess Estelle, Duchess of Östergötland, Princess of Sweden
- Estelle Akofio-Sowah, Scottish-born Ghanaian businesswoman
- Estelle Alphand (born 1995), Swedish-French alpine skier
- Estelle Mendell Amory (1845–?), American educator and author
- Estelle Asmodelle, Australian transgender model, dancer, actress, musician, engineer and astronomer
- Estelle Axton (1918–2004), American record executive
- Estelle Bajou, American actor, composer, musician, producer, and writer
- Estelle Balet, Swiss champion snowboarder
- Estelle Baskerville (born 1946), American athlete
- Estelle Basor, American mathematician
- Estelle Beauchamp, Canadian educator and writer
- Estelle Beere (1875–1959), New Zealand dancing teacher
- Estelle Bennett, American singer (the Ronettes)
- Estelle Bernadotte (1904–1984), Countess of Wisborg
- Estelle Blackburn, award-winning Australian journalist
- Estelle Brody (1900–1995), American actress
- Estelle Cascarino (born 1997), French football player
- Estelle Ceulemans, Belgian politician and trade unionist
- Estelle Chen, French model of Chinese descent
- Estelle Bee Dagum, Argentine and Canadian economist and statistician
- Estelle Denis (born 1976), French journalist and television presenter
- Estelle Desanges (born 1977), stage name of a French pornographic actress
- Estelle Elizabeth (born 1996), French ice dancer
- Estelle Etterre (1899–1996), American actress
- Estelle Evans (1906–1985), Bahamian-American actress
- Estelle Folest (born 1976), French politician
- Estelle Freedman, American feminist scholar
- Estelle Getty (1923–2008), American actress; star of The Golden Girls
- Estelle Grelier (born 1973), French politician
- Estelle Griswold (1900–1981), American civil rights activist and feminist
- Estelle Harman (1922–1995), American acting coach
- Estelle Harris, (1928–2022) American actress - Estelle Costanza in Seinfeld
- Estelle Hemsley (1887–1968), African American actress of stage and screen
- Estelle May Hurll (1863–1924), American writer
- Estelle Ishigo (1899–1990), American water color artist
- Estelle Venner Keogh (1892–1966), Australian nurse who served in World War I
- Estelle Muriel Kerr (1879–1971), Canadian painter, illustrator and writer
- Estelle Klein (1930–2004), advocate and supporter of folk music in Canada
- Estelle Kohler (born 1940), British theatre and television actress
- Estelle Lawson (1907–1983), American amateur golfer
- Estelle Lawton Lindsey, American journalist
- Estelle Lazer, Australian archaeologist
- Estelle Lefébure, French model
- Estelle Anna Lewis (1824–1880) American poet and dramatist
- Estelle Liebling, American vocal coach
- Estelle Mercier (born 1973), French politician
- Estelle M. H. Merrill (1858–1908), American journalist, editor
- Estelle Nze Minko (born 1991), French handball player
- Estelle Morris Baroness Morris of Yardley, British politician
- Estelle Mossely (born 1992), French boxer
- Estelle Massey Osborne (1901–1981), African American nurse and educator
- Estelle Nathan, British painter
- Estelle Nollet (born 1977), French writer
- Estelle Paranque, French historian
- Estelle Parsons (born 1927), American actress
- Estelle Perrossier (born 1990), French sprinter
- Estelle Quérard (born 1979), French volleyball player
- Estelle Ramey (1917–2006), American endocrinologist, physiologist and feminist
- Estelle Reiner (1914–2008), American actress and singer
- Estelle Ricketts (1871-?), American composer
- Estelle Roberts (1889–1970), British spiritualist medium
- Estelle Sapir, Polish Jewish Holocaust survivor and litigant
- Estelle Sartini (born 1973), French rugby player
- Estelle Skornik (born 1971), French actress
- Estelle Swaray (born 1980), British singer/rapper
- Estelle Turrell Smith (1854-19??), social reformer
- Estelle Taylor, American silent movie actress
- Estelle Thomson (1894–1953), Australian naturalist and botanical artist
- Estelle Thompson, Australian crime writer
- Estelle Weigel (1914–1967), American figure skater
- Estelle Winwood, British character actress
- Estelle Yancey (1896–1986), American blues singer

== See also ==
- Estelle (surname)
- Esther (given name)
- Stella (given name)
