= Estela =

Estela may refer to:

- Estela (Póvoa de Varzim), Portugal
- Estela, Buenos Aires, Argentina
- CD Estela, a Spanish basketball team

== People with the given name ==
- Estela Perlas-Bernabe (born 1952), Philippine jurist
- Estela de Carlotto (born 1930), Argentine human rights activist
- Estela Casas (born 1961), American news anchor
- Estela Beatriz Cols (1965-2010), Argentine pedagogue, researcher, and full professor
- Estela Domínguez (born 1969), Spanish volleyball player
- Estela García (born 1989), Spanish sprinter
- Estela Giménez (born 1979), Spanish rhythmic gymnast
- Estela Golovchenko (born 1963), Uruguayan playwright, actress, and theater director
- Estela Inda (1917–1995), Mexican actress
- Estela Jiménez Esponda, Mexican women's rights activist
- Estela Milanés (born 1967), Cuban softball player
- Estela Molina (1948–2025), Mexican professional wrestler
- Estela Navascués (born 1981), Spanish long-distance runner
- Estela Portillo-Trambley (1936–1999), American poet and playwright
- Estela Quesada (1924–2011), Costa Rican lawyer and politician
- Estela Renner (born 1973), Brazilian filmmaker
- Estela Rodríguez (born 1967), Cuban judoka

=== Fictional characters ===
- Estela de la Cruz, a character in the Netflix series 13 Reasons Why
- Estela, the Castilian Spanish name of Rosalina, a character in the Mario franchise.

== Other uses ==
- Estela (restaurant), a Michelin-starred restaurant in New York City.

== See also ==
- Estella (disambiguation)
- Stella (disambiguation)
