= Estelle =

Estelle may refer to:

== People ==
- Estelle (given name), a female given name, including a list of people
- Estelle (surname), a list of people
- Estelle (musician) (born 1980), British singer and rapper
- Princess Estelle, Duchess of Östergötland

== Fictional characters ==
- Estelle Blofis, a character in Trials of Apollo by Rick Riordan
- Estelle Bright, a main character in the video game The Legend of Heroes: Trails in the Sky
- Estelle Costanza, on the television series Seinfeld
- Estelle Leonard, a recurring character in the Friends television series
- Estelle Green, in Diana Wynne Jones' fantasy novel Witch Week
- Estellise Sidos Heurassein, a main character in the video game Tales of Vesperia
- Estelle, in Jean-Paul Sartre's No Exit

== Places ==
- Estelle (Arrigas), a hamlet in France
- Estelle, a hamlet in France, part of the commune of Saint-Jory, Haute-Garonne
- Estelle, Georgia, United States, an unincorporated community
- Estelle, Louisiana, United States, a census-designated place
- Estelle Mountain, California, United States

== Ships ==
- Estelle Maersk, a container ship
- SV Estelle, a fair trade cargo Bermuda schooner
- USS Estelle (SP-747), a United States Navy patrol boat commissioned in 1917 and stricken in 1933

== Other uses ==
- Hurricane Estelle (disambiguation), several tropical cyclones
- Skoda Estelle, the British name for the Škoda 105/120 car
- A brand name of co-cyprindiol (cyproterone acetate/ethinylestradiol), a combined birth control pill
- A brand name of estetrol/drospirenone, a combined birth control pill

== See also ==
- Estelle v. Gamble, a 1976 US Supreme Court case
- Estelle v. Smith, a 1981 US Supreme Court case
- Estelle v. Williams, a 1976 US Supreme Court case
- Estella (disambiguation)
