= Holovchenko =

Holovchenko, also transliterated Golovchenko or Golovčenko (Ukrainian: Головченко) is a Ukrainian surname. Its Belarusian-language equivalent is Halouchenka/Haloŭčenka (Belarusian: Галоўчэнка). Notable people with the surname include:

== Holovchenko ==
- Arkadiy Holovchenko (born 1936), Ukrainian swimmer
- Ivan Holovchenko (1918–1992), Ukrainian militsiya general
- Lyudmyla Holovchenko (born 1978), Ukrainian sport wrestler
- Tetyana Holovchenko (born 1980), Ukrainian middle and long-distance runner

== Golovchenko ==
- Estela Golovchenko (born 1963), Uruguayan playwright, actress, and theater director
- Javier Golovchenko (born 1974), Uruguayan swimmer
- Jene Golovchenko (1946–2018), American physicist
- Roman Golovchenko (born 1973), Belarusian politician
- Yevgeni Golovchenko (born 1973), Russian football player

== Golovčenko ==
- Sergej Mironović Golovčenko (1898–1937), Croatian-Russian writer and illustrator
