= Doris Pike White =

American businesswoman and civic leader

24th President General, National Society Daughters of the American Revolution
- In office 1959–1962
- Preceded by: Allene Wilson Groves
- Succeeded by: Marion Moncure Duncan

Maine State Regent, National Society Daughters of the American Revolution
- In office 1952–1954
- President: Marguerite Courtright Patton (1952–1953); Gertrude Sprague Carraway (1953–1954)

Personal details
- Born: Doris Pike; December 1, 1896 Lubec, Maine, U.S.
- Died: November 22, 1987 (aged 90) Portland, Maine, U.S.
- Resting place: Mount Hope Cemetery
- Spouse: Ashmead White (1944–1952; his death)
- Education: Wellesley College; Stanford University

Doris Pike White (December 1, 1896 – November 22, 1987) was an American businesswoman, investment banker, and civic leader who served as the 24th President General of the Daughters of the American Revolution. Prior to serving as president general, she was the NSDAR State Regent of Maine. White was vice president of the investment firm Pierce, White, and Drummond, Inc. Pike served on the White House Conference on Highway Safety Committee in 1955 and was the only woman appointed to serve on the Maine Judicial Council.

== Early life and education ==
White was born Doris Pike on December 1, 1896 in Lubec, Maine, to Chester Lincoln Pike and Lottie Avery Pike.

She graduated from Wellesley College and did graduate work at Stanford University. White received an honorary doctor of humane letters from Bowdoin College in 1960.

== Career ==
White taught languages, economics, and history at schools in Massachusetts and in New York City. She also worked as a training director at a prominent department store on Fifth Avenue in Manhattan. She was active in her family's industrial business until it sold in 1954.

Following the death of her husband in 1952, White entered the field of investment banking. She worked as the vice president of Pierce, White and Drummond Inc., an investment firm in Bangor, Maine.

=== Public service ===
White was one of eight women appointed to the Planning Committee for the White House Conference on Highway Safety in 1954. She also served on the Maine Highway Safety Committee in 1955 and was twice appointed as one of three non-judge members to the Maine Judicial Council by the governor of Maine. She was the only woman appointed to the judicial council.

She was active at her husband's alma mater, Bowdoin College, where she served as president of the Society of Bodwoin Women.

White was awarded the George Washington Honor Medal by the Freedoms Foundation at Valley Forge for her speech, For What Avail If Freedom Fail.

==== Daughters of the American Revolution ====
In 1937, White joined the Hannah Weston Chapter of the Daughters of the American Revolution. In 1939, she served as a page at the NSDAR Continental Congress. She served as chapter regent of the Hannah Weston Chapter from 1948 to 1950. She later transferred her membership to the Frances Dighton Williams Chapter.

She served as the State Regent of Maine from 1952 to 1954 and served as National Chairman of the Americanism Committee and the Chairman of the DAR Manual for Citizenship Committee from 1953 to 1956. She was elected in 1954 as a Vice President General of the national society, receiving more votes than any other candidate. She served as president of the Vice Presidents General Club from 1955 to 1957.

In 1959, White was elected President General of the national society, defeating Kathryn Newland of Michigan. During her presidency, she presented Baron Wernher von Braun with the DAR Americanism Medal, on May 27, 1959 in New York City, for his work with Explorer I and Pioneer I.

In 1961, a luncheon was given in her honor at Paramount Studios after she presented John Wayne with the Motion Picture Award at NSDAR Continental Congress.

White visited Hawaii, newly admitted as a U.S. state, on May 30, 1961 and placed a wreath at the USS Arizona to honor those who died during the Attack on Pearl Harbor in World War II.

Following her retirement as president general, she served as president of the National Officers Club from 1974 to 1976.

The Doris White Auditorium and Gymnasium at Kate Duncan Smith DAR School, and it's endowment fund, were dedicated in her honor on October 24, 1961.

== Personal life ==
She married the businessman Ashmead White on August 12, 1944. Her husband died in 1952.

White died in Portland, Maine on November 22, 1987. She was buried in Mount Hope Cemetery in Bangor.
