= Estella =

Estella is the Latinized and Italian version of the French feminine given name Estelle, which means star.

Estella may refer to:

== People ==
- Diego de Estella (1524–1578)
- Estella Armstrong O'Byrne (1891–1987), American civic leader and anti-communist
- Estella Hijmans-Hertzveld (1837–1881), Dutch poet, translator, activist
- Estella Loupatty (born 2003), soccer player
- Estella Sneider (born 1950)
- Estella Marie Thompson (born 1969), American sex worker
- Estella Warren (born 1978), Canadian actress
- Estella Weeks (1886–1969), American researcher
- Estella, the nom de guerre of Italian labor leader Teresa Noce

=== Fictional ===
- Estella Havisham, a character in Charles Dickens' novel Great Expectations
- Estella Von Hellman, the birth name of Cruella De Vil in the movie Cruella (film)
- Estella (エステラ), a character in the animated series Vivy: Fluorite Eye's Song produced by Wit Studio

== Places ==
- Estella-Lizarra, Navarre, Spain
- Estella, New South Wales, Australia
- Estella, Wisconsin, United States
- Estella Occidental, comarca of Navarre, Spain
- Estella Oriental, comarca of Navarre, Spain
- Mount Estella, mountain in Alberta, Canada

== Songs ==
- "Estella", by KennyHoopla, 2020

== Other ==
- USS Estella (SP-537), a United States Navy patrol boat in commission from 1917 to 1919

== See also ==
- Estela (disambiguation)
