= Chen Yihan (disambiguation) =

Chen Yihan may refer to:

- Chen Yihan (陳逸涵; born 1994), Chinese pianist and composer living in Plainfield, Indiana
- Estelle Chen (陈意涵; born 1997), Chinese actress, singer and dancer cast in Chinese television series Dance of the Phoenix and Love Like the Galaxy
- Ivy Chen (陳意涵; born 1982), Taiwanese actress

== See also ==
- Chen (surname)
- Estelle (disambiguation)
- Ivy (disambiguation)
