= Estell =

Estell is a surname. Notable people with the surname include:

- Dick Estell (1926–2016), American radio personality
- John Estell (1861–1928), Australian politician

== See also ==
- Estelle (disambiguation)
