= Area of archaeological potential =

Location likely containing archaeological finds

Areas of archaeological potential, also known as areas of high archaeological potential or urban archaeological zones, are locations within a country identified by archeologists as sites where buried archaeological artifacts are likely to survive. There are hundreds of thousands of areas of archaeological potential worldwide, yet many factors limit the excavation of them. There is a multitude of factors that contribute to these areas of archaeological potential, mainly the environmental factors, but also political factors, and the history that the country holds.

== Environmental factors ==
The environmental factors which contribute to the preservation of archaeological sites are an integral component when it comes to areas of archaeological potential. The key features of areas with high archaeological potential are that they are dry, cold, and waterlogged. These three features must have stayed at a constant state throughout the entirety of their existence, for the archaeological find to remain in a stable state. There are many specific features that contribute to areas of archaeological potential, but the key component is that the environmental factors remained at a constant state throughout the entirety of their existence. Determining which areas will be of archaeological potential is not limited to what areas have the best environmental factors but also which areas will offer a contribution to “the knowledge of world culture and human behaviour”.

== Current areas ==
=== Egypt ===
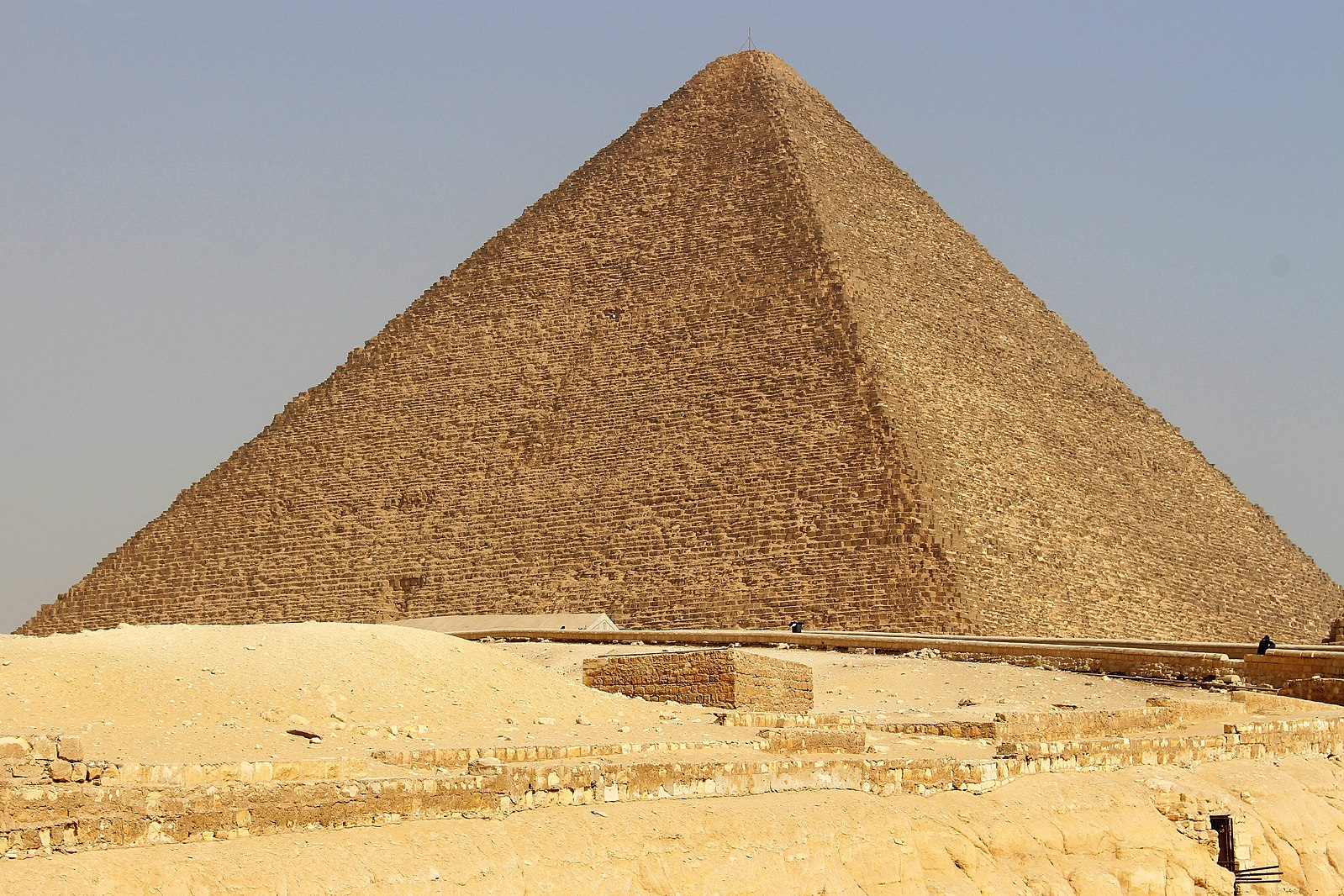
The Great Pyramid of Giza

Due to Egypt's long-held historical legacy, it is one place in the world that has the highest level of archaeological potential. The main reason for the great success archaeologists have come across in Egypt is due to the careful construction of the pyramids hundreds of centuries ago. The pyramids were constructed in a period referred to as the Pyramid Age, which spanned over a thousand years, beginning in the third dynasty and ending in the Second Intermediate Period. The careful construction of these pyramids, specifically the Great Pyramid of Giza, according to Herodotus, took 100 000 men and over 20 years to build. Due to the intricate design and level of protection these pyramids hold, they have subsequently created an ideal environment for the artifacts within to withstand thousands of years. Archaeologists have been able to find an excess of information about this ancient civilisation. In this, the location of these areas in Egypt of archaeological potential are extremely dry, helping to preserve the artifacts and other monuments. Although, these sites and other stone monuments do suffer from several factors of deterioration, including air temperature, relative humidity, wind erosion and air pollution.

=== Pompeii ===
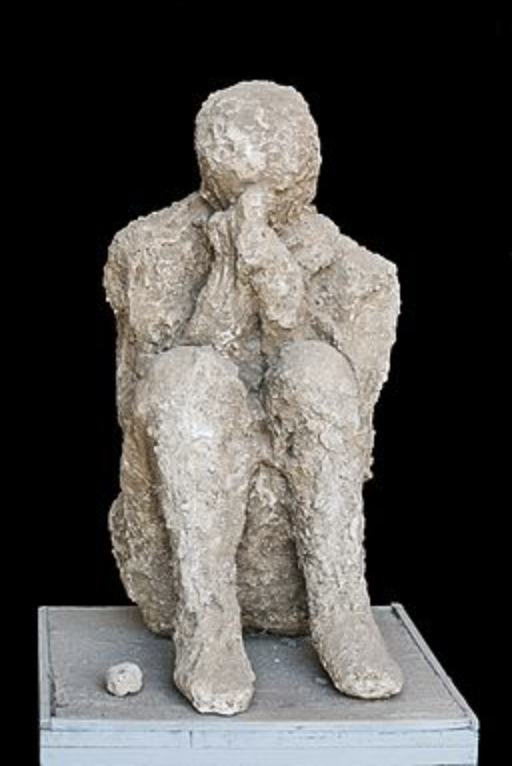
Plaster cast of a Victim of Pompeii

Pompeii was one of the greatest archaeological finds in history, with almost an entire, perfectly preserved Roman civilisation being excavated. The eruption of Vesuvius in 69AD covered the entire civilisation in a pyroclastic surge, a cloud of ash and superheated gases (100–499 degrees C) traveling at 100–200 kilometers an hour. This surge instantaneously killed all humans whilst covering the town in a protective layer of ash which was shortly followed by a pyroclastic surge, a ground-hugging avalanche of superheated fragments of volcanic rock and gas moving at 65–80 km an hour, which covered the entirety of the town. The town was covered, and everything inside was preserved just as it was in 69 BC. Due to this natural disaster, the town is deemed as an area of high archaeological potential. The site of Pompeii has been an incredibly useful source for understanding the daily life of Roman citizens in 69 BC. The town continues to provide evidence as archaeologists remain persistent in uncovering the entirety of the site.

=== Athens and Greece ===
Greece, specifically its islands and Athens is home to many monumental sites which have a significant legacy in the western world. Imperialism in the fifth century BC directly impacted Athens and other neighboring countries in the Aegean, and due to the imperialistic regime of Pericles, Athens and Greece itself has become an area of acute archeological potential. Pericles wanted to present an image that visually reveal the social, political, and military strength and power that Athens held over the Mediterranean. Pericles was successful and is largely attributed to the Golden Age of Greece, a time when Greece was the superpower of the Aegean. The Acropolis and other large monumental sites including the Parthenon, the Propylaea, and various statues still stand proudly over Athens today. The most renowned archeological site in Athens is the Acropolis, built in the second half of the fifth century BC for military purposes, it quickly shifted to a place of worship for Athena, and thus was marked as a sacred site.

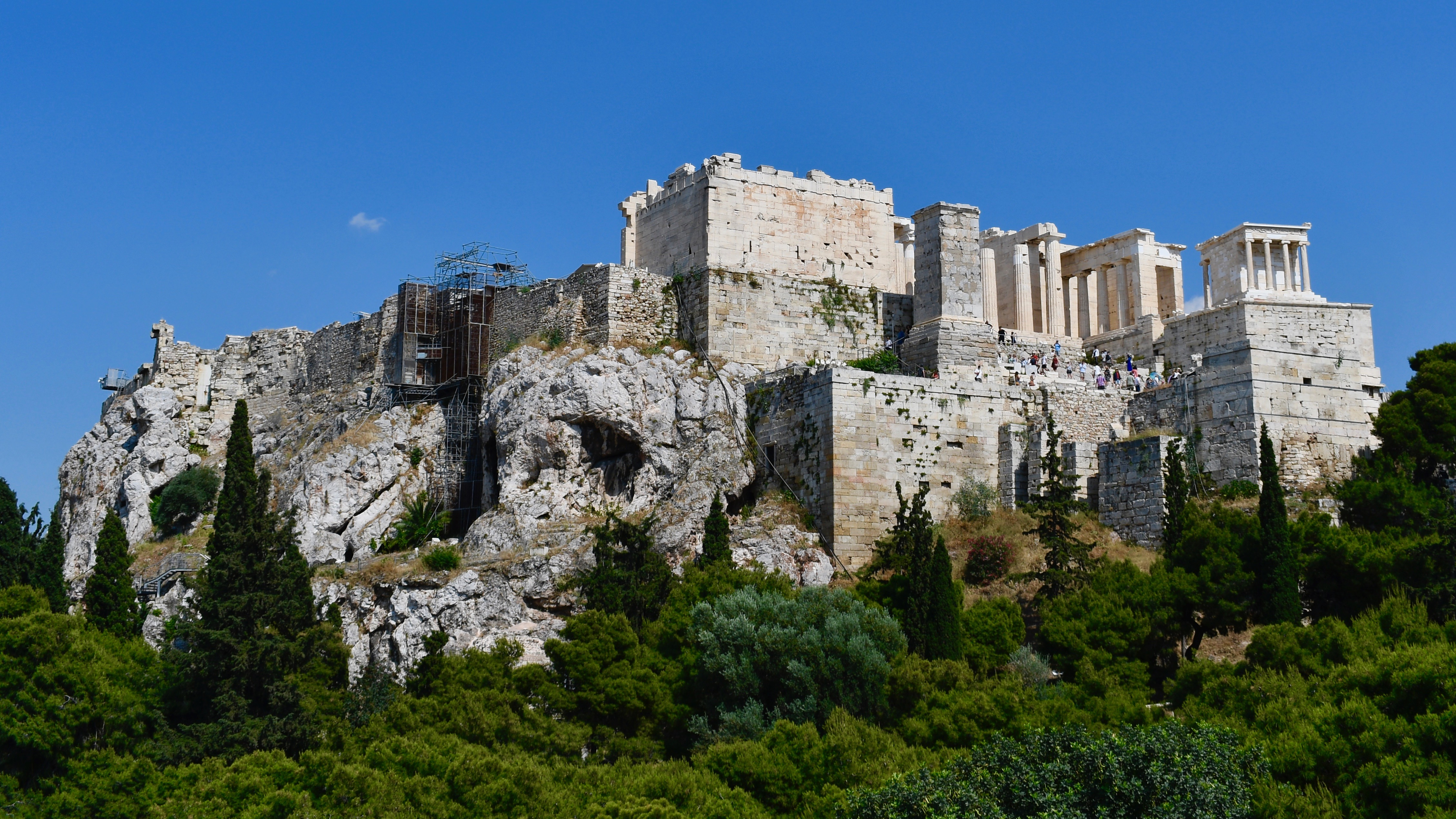
The Acropolis in Athens

The climate in Greece also played an instrumental factor in preserving archeological artifacts, much like in Egypt and Pompeii. Southern Greece enjoys what is referred to as a “Mediterranean” climate, which includes light winter rains and summer droughts. The climate doesn't change drastically throughout the year in Greece, meaning that the multitude of artifacts do not get exposed to harsh and extreme weather conditions.

== Potential of digital archeology ==
Digital archaeology has been an integral component in recent years when determining which sites across the world hold archaeological potential. Digital advances have also shaped the world of archaeology, making excavations more efficient, effective, and purposeful. Following a successful season of field testing in 2011, the Tel Akko Total Archaeology Project (Akko, Israel) found that Agisoft's PhotoScan Pro-one became an extremely useful tool in creating accurate 3D images of archaeological sites, providing a new outlet for the dissemination of archaeological data. There are multiple examples of the way digital archaeology has positively affected the field of archaeology, with Pompeii being one of the most successful. As a historic site with millions of visitors each year, Pompeii and Herculaneum face conservation issues, yet with the use of 3D scanning, online visual representations of the site have been made available, decreasing the deterioration of the site. Estelle Laser, an Australian Archeologist, first used CT scans on plaster casts, which in turn have helped to gain a much clearer sense of the reality of the people who died, uncovering their age, gender, health, and other important features. Laser's work changed the story of Pompeii, dismembering the common notion that those who died at Pompeii were primarily women, children, and the elderly. Laser additionally undid the wrongdoings of Fiorelli and Spinazzola. This new information about the bodies found on the site has helped archaeologists to gain a deeper knowledge of the people of Vesuvius and their daily life.

== Political influences on archeological digs ==
Politics heavily influence archaeology and the sites that are deemed to have archaeological potential. Many countries have a rich history and idyllic conditions which all point towards archaeological potential, although politics hamper their uncovering both positively and negatively. In the case of Pompeii, politics in the early 20th century significantly damaged the site. Mussolini was in power when great excavations were taking place in Pompeii, and despite being the most productive period of excavations at the site, the damage these excavations caused was more detrimental to the site than positive. The excavations corresponded to the Fascist government of Mussolini, which exploited the potential of Italy's past to ‘create a model for a new imperialist Italy’. Despite his wide-ranging excavations, by the time Mussolini was forced out of the office, 26 hectares of the total 66 were not excavated, and further, by the late 50s and early 60s, Pompeii was in a state of disrepair. In some circumstances, politics help archaeological digs take place. For example, in Egypt, a large amount of money is given each year to help preserve the historical monuments, as they create a large influx of tourism and therefore money. Tourism in Egypt is one of the leading sources of income for the country with US$12.57 billion produced in 2019/2018. The political agenda in Egypt has recently changed as politicians realised the importance of these monuments to not only the world but the economy. Although, in many cases, countries with high archaeological potential do not have enough money to uncover monuments and keep them in good condition.
