= Marion Moncure Duncan =

25th President General of the Daughters of the American Revolution

25th President General, National Society Daughters of the American Revolution
- In office 1962–1965
- Preceded by: Doris Pike White
- Succeeded by: Adele Woodhouse Erb Sullivan

Personal details
- Born: Marion Elizabeth Moncure; December 19, 1913 Alexandria, Virginia, U.S.
- Died: April 15, 1978 (aged 64) Alexandria, Virginia, U.S.
- Resting place: Pohick Church Cemetery
- Party: Democratic
- Spouse: Robert V. H. Duncan
- Children: 4
- Education: College of William & Mary; George Washington University
- Occupation: Businesswoman

Marion Elizabeth Moncure Duncan (December 19, 1913 – April 15, 1978) was an American businesswoman and civic leader. She served as the 25th president general of the Daughters of the American Revolution from 1962 to 1965. As president general, she testified before a United States congressional committee regarding proposed changes to immigration law, was a strong opponent of state socialism and American foreign policies with socialist countries, and condemned U.S. Supreme Court rulings prohibiting school prayer in the United States. Duncan also served as the president of the Order of the First Families of Virginia and as the vice president of the Northern Virginia Association of Insurance Agents. She was named as one of twelve leading women in the United States by Holiday in 1963.

== Early life and education ==
Duncan was born Marion Elizabeth Moncure on December 19, 1913 in Alexandria, Virginia, to Ida Virginia Grigg Moncure and Robinson Moncure. Her father was a lawyer who later served as a judge on the city's corporation court. She was a granddaughter of Thomas Jefferson Moncure, who served as a delegate representing King George County and Stafford County at the Virginia Constitutional Convention of 1901–02.

She attended the College of William & Mary from 1931 to 1932, performing an interpretive dance with her physical education class at the Yorktown Sesquicentennial Celebration. She later transferred to George Washington University, preferring the cultural and social life of Washington, D.C. over that of Williambsurg. Duncan completed shorthand and typewriting certifications at a secretarial school in Washington, D.C. and, in 1935, began volunteering for the American Red Cross.

== Career and civic engagements ==
In 1941, Duncan was a secretary for Walter Sherman Gifford, the president of American Telephone and Telegraph. From 1945 to 1947, she was a secretary for Basil O'Connor, director of the American Red Cross. After that, Duncan was employed as a court reporter and, later, as an accredited insurance broker. From 1953 to 1976, she operated Bob Duncan Real Estate–Insurance. She served as vice president of the Northern Virginia Association of Insurance Agents and was a founding member of Senior Services of Alexandria in 1968.

From 1966 to 1974, Duncan served on the board of visitors of the College of William & Mary.

Duncan served as the fourth vice president of the Kenmore Association from 1950 to 1953. In 1953, Duncan was appointed to the board of trustees and directors of the Jamestown Corporation, which staged the outdoor symphonic drama The Common Glory in Williamsburg. From 1959 to 1961, she served as the president of the Aquia Church Association. From 1975 to 1978, Duncan served as the first vice president of the Order of the First Families of Virginia and served as the order's president from 1975 to 1978. She was also an official in the Virginian society of the National Society of the Colonial Dames of America. She was also a member of the National Society Colonial Dames XVII Century, the Daughters of Colonial Wars, Lords of the Maryland Manors, the Daughters of the Barons of Runnemede, and the Order of the Crown in America.

She was selected as the "Outstanding Woman of 1963" by the Alexandria Soroptimist Club and named as one of the twelve leading women in the United States by Holiday. In 1964, she received the George Washington Honor Medal from the Freedoms Foundation.

=== Daughters of the American Revolution ===
Duncan was an organizing member of the John Alexander Chapter of the National Society Daughters of the American Revolution in 1932, serving as chapter regent from 1937 to 1940. She went on to serve as Virginia State DAR recording secretary from 1944 to 1947, as state vice regent from 1947 to 1950, and as state regent from 1950 to 1953. From 1953 to 1956, during the presidency of Gertrude Sprague Carraway, she served as secretary general of the national society. In 1962, she was elected as the national society's twenty-fifth president general, serving in this capacity until 1965. She was the first Virginian to serve as president general (although Virginian Mary Virginia Ellet Cabell served as Vice President Presiding from 1892 to 1893) and the youngest woman elected to the office.

As president general, Duncan criticized the United States Supreme Court's rulings in Engel v. Vitale (1962) and Abington School District v. Schempp (1963) that prohibited school prayer and school-sponsored Bible reading in public schools. She also opposed U.S. foreign policy in Latin America, which she considered an endorsement of state socialism.

In August 1964, Duncan testified before a congressional committee regarding proposed changes to American immigration law. She expressed the NSDAR's support for existing immigration quotas based on national origin that gave preference to immigrants from Western Europe.

Through her administration's "Know-Do-Tell" initiative, Duncan led the national society in annually distribution of $200,000 in scholarships and supported four schools in the southern and western United States.

In 1965, she served as supervising editor of In Washington: The National Society Daughters of the American Revolution, Diamond Anniversary, 1890-1965.

== Personal life and death ==
On October 26, 1939, she married the businessman Robert Vernon Harris Duncan at Christ Church. They had four sons. Duncan's husband was a founding president of the George Washington Chapter of the Virginia Society Sons of the American Revolution and served as the state president of the Virginia Society SAR from 1960 to 1961. They lived in a century-old brick townhouse in Alexandria and owned the historic Colchester Inn, built in 1750, which they used as a summer house.

She was a Democrat and attended political rallies and conventions.

Duncan died of cancer on April 15, 1978 in Alexandria. Her funeral was held at Christ Church and she was buried in the cemetery of Pohick Episcopal Church in Fairfax County.
