= Turrell (name) =

Turrell may refer to the following people:

Given or middle name

- Estelle Turrell Smith (1854–?), American social reformer
- Turrell V. Wylie (1927–1984), American scholar, Tibetologist and sinologist

Surname

- Edmund Turrell (died 1835), British engraver
- James Turrell (born 1943), American artist
- Noël Turrell (born 1947), French Olympic biathlete

== See also ==
- Turell
