= Elwood Edwards =

American voice actor (1949–2024)

- Edwards in 2015
- Born: Elwood Hughes Edwards Jr. November 6, 1949; Glen Burnie, Maryland, U.S.
- Died: November 5, 2024 (aged 74); New Bern, North Carolina, U.S.
- Education: New Bern High School
- Occupation: Voice actor
- Years active: 1964–2016
- Known for: Voice acting for AOL
- Spouses: Betsy Fulcher (divorced); Karen Adams (divorced)
- Children: 2

Elwood Hughes Edwards Jr. (November 6, 1949 – November 5, 2024) was an American voice actor. He was best known as the voice of various soundmarks for the Internet service provider America Online which he first recorded in 1989. This included AOL's trademark "You've got mail" greeting.

== Career ==
Edwards started in radio while in high school, in 1964. After high school, he continued into television, working as a live booth announcer. Despite some on-air work, including a car commercial, reporting news or sports, and a short stint as a weatherman, Edwards focused mainly on off-camera work, with work ranging from graphics to operating cameras. He later worked at WKYC in Cleveland, until his retirement in 2016.

In 1989, Edwards's wife, an employee for online service Q-Link, overheard company CEO Steve Case describe how he wanted to add a voice to its user interface. She recommended Edwards for the job, and he was paid $200 (equivalent to $519 in 2025) to record the lines. In October, his voice premiered on AOL's new program. His greetings include "Welcome", "You've got mail", "You've got pictures", "You've got voicemail", "File's done", and "Goodbye", all recorded in his own living room on a cassette deck.

His voice also appeared in a 2000 episode of The Simpsons, "Little Big Mom" (where he provided the voice of a virtual doctor, saying "You've got leprosy"), and in advertising for the 1998 film You've Got Mail.

After retirement, he sold personalized WAV files through his website.

On the March 4, 2015, episode of The Tonight Show Starring Jimmy Fallon, Edwards appeared on screen to read phrases which were meant to be humorous. As of November 2016, Edwards was seen on Instagram and YouTube working as an Uber driver. On September 16, 2019, Edwards and his AOL story were featured on the podcast Twenty Thousand Hertz in an episode entitled "You've Got Mail".

In October 2022, Edwards appeared in a television ad for the e-commerce platform Shopify, in which he announced "You've got sales" to sellers on the platform.

== Personal life and death ==
Elwood Hughes Edwards Jr. was born in Glen Burnie, Maryland, on November 6, 1949, and grew up primarily in North Carolina, first in Beaufort and then in New Bern. He graduated from New Bern High School in 1967. Edwards was a Baptist and was a minister at one point.

Edwards married Betsy Fulcher, and they had two children before divorcing. He then married Karen Adams, whom he had met online through a Q-Link dating service; their marriage also ended in divorce.

Edwards died of complications from a stroke at his home in New Bern, North Carolina, on November 5, 2024, one day before his 75th birthday.

== Other jobs ==
- News graphics supervisor, WKYC-TV
- General manager, KVVV 1998
- Production manager/senior director, WCTI-TV
- Announcer/director, WNBE-TV
- Uber driver
