= USS Ahdeek =

Patrol vessel of the United States Navy

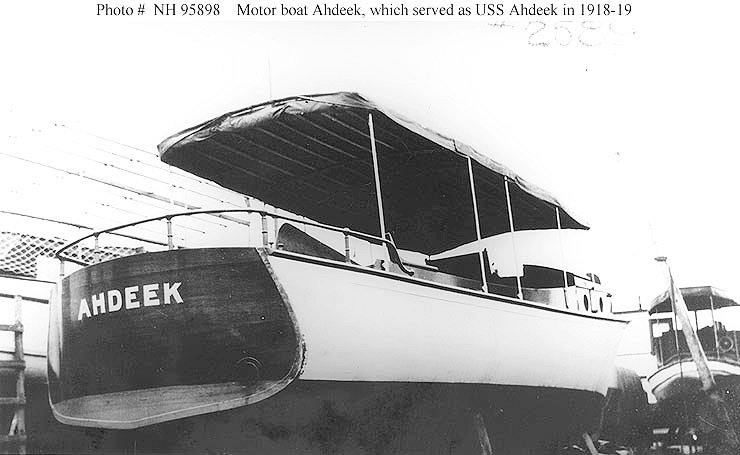
- Ahdeek as a private motorboat, hauled out of the water sometime between 1916 and 1918.

History

United States
- Name: USS Ahdeek
- Builder: Charles L. Seabury Company and Gas Engine and Power Company, Morris Heights, the Bronx, New York
- Completed: 1916
- Acquired: 2 September 1918
- Commissioned: 1918
- Stricken: 25 October 1933
- Notes: On loan to Culver Naval School 1919–1933

General characteristics
- Length: 38 ft (12 m)
- Beam: 8 ft 3 in (2.51 m)
- Draft: 2 ft 9 in (0.84 m) aft
- Propulsion: Internal combustion engine, one shaft
- Speed: 20 miles per hour

USS Ahdeek (SP-2589) was a United States Navy patrol vessel in commission from 1918 to 1919.

Ahdeek was built as a private single-screw wooden-hulled motorboat in 1916 by the Charles L. Seabury Company and Gas Engine and Power Company at Morris Heights in the Bronx, New York, for H. V. Schieren. On 7 April 1918, the 3rd Naval District inspected her for possible U.S. Navy use as an "aeronautic patrol" boat during World War I. Ordered taken over by the Navy on 12 June 1918, she finally was acquired by the Navy on 2 September 1918 and assigned the section patrol number 2589. She was commissioned as USS Ahdeek (SP-2589).

Ahdeek served on section patrol duty for the rest of World War I and into 1919. On 23 June 1919, a dispatch directed the Commandant, 3rd Naval District, to ship her and the patrol boat USS Estelle (SP-747) to the Culver Naval School in Culver, Indiana. Ahdeek operated there on loan from the Navy for many years. She finally was stricken from the Navy Directory on 25 October 1933.
