= New Bern High School =

American public school in North Carolina

Location
- 4200 Academic Drive; New Bern, North Carolina 28562; United States; 35°06′02″N 77°06′55″W

Information
- Type: Public
- Motto: Home of Scholars and Champions
- School district: Craven County Schools
- CEEB code: 342882
- Teaching staff: 88.83 (FTE)
- Grades: 9–12
- Enrollment: 1,632 (2023-2024)
- Student to teacher ratio: 18.37
- Colors: Red, white and black
- Team name: Bears
- Communities served: New Bern, Trent Woods, James City, Brices Creek, River Bend
- Feeder schools: H.J. MacDonald Middle School, Grover C. Fields Middle School
- Website: nbh.cravenk12.org

New Bern High School is a high school in New Bern, North Carolina. The student population is approximately 1,700, and there are 165 faculty and staff members. The student-teacher ratio is approximately 14:1.

== Sports ==
=== Athletic teams overview ===
New Bern is a member of the North Carolina High School Athletic Association (NCHSAA). Sports teams at the school include American football, boys' and girls' soccer, boys' and girls' lacrosse, swimming, track and field, indoor track, cross country, boys' and girls' basketball, volleyball, baseball, softball, wrestling and cheerleading.

New Bern High School has won numerous state, regional and conference championships. State team championships include baseball (1966), American football (2007, 2012, 2014), boys' outdoor track (2006, 2007, 2008, 2009) and boys' indoor track (2006, 2008).

=== Track and field ===
The boys track and field team won four straight NCHSAA 4A outdoor state championships in 2006, 2007, 2008 and 2009.

In February 2009, the New Bern boys 4x400 relay team that consisted of Anthony Hendrix, Andrew Hendrix, Fuquawn Green, and Miles Sparks, ran a time of 3:13.06, which set the high school national record for fastest 4x400 relay time.

=== American football ===
The New Bern football team has won three NCHSAA state championships in 2007 (4AA), 2012 (4A) and 2014 (4A), under former head coach Bobby Curlings. The school was stripped of its fourth state championship, which was won in 2022 (4A), for using academically ineligible players.

The football team plays its home games at Caruso-Coates Stadium and the Bobby Curlings Field, located on New Bern's campus.

== Naval JROTC ==
The NJROTC at New Bern High School earned "Distinguished Unit" honors for 15 consecutive years (2004–2018).

== AVID ==
New Bern High School is an AVID school. In 2018, the school was recognized as School-wide site of Distinction. In 2022 the school earned the distinction of being awarded the status of National Demonstration in School.

== Notable alumni ==
- Bill Bunting (1965) – professional basketball player
- Gertrude Sprague Carraway (1912) – 22nd President General of the Daughters of the American Revolution
- Davon Drew (2004) – NFL tight end
- Elwood Edwards – voice of AOL's "You've got mail" sound among other greetings
- Montario Hardesty (2005) – former NFL running back and college football coach
- Nathan Healy – professional basketball player
- Mike Hughes (2015) – NFL cornerback
- Sinisa Malesevic – sociologist
- Linda McMahon (1966) – current United States Secretary of Education, 25th Administrator of the Small Business Administration, former president and CEO of WWE
- Michael R. Morgan – Associate Justice on the North Carolina Supreme Court
- Dan Neil – journalist
- Kevin Reddick (2008) – NFL linebacker
- Chandler Seagle (2014) – MLB catcher
- Brian Simmons (1993) – NFL linebacker
- Adam Warren (2005) – MLB pitcher
