= Kevin Reddick =

American football player (born 1989)

No. 52, 51
- Position: Linebacker

Personal information
- Born: December 28, 1989 (age 36); New Bern, North Carolina, U.S.
- Listed height: 6 ft 1 in (1.85 m)
- Listed weight: 243 lb (110 kg)

Career information
- High school: New Bern
- College: North Carolina
- NFL draft: 2013: undrafted

Career history
- New Orleans Saints (2013); St. Louis Rams (2014)*; San Diego Chargers (2014); Carolina Panthers (2014); Buffalo Bills (2015)
- * Offseason or practice squad member only

Awards and highlights
- First-team All-ACC (2012)

Career NFL statistics
- Total tackles: 17
- Forced fumbles: 1
- Stats at Pro Football Reference

Kevin Reddick (born December 28, 1989) is an American former professional football player who was a linebacker in the National Football League (NFL). He played college football for the North Carolina Tar Heels. He was signed by the New Orleans Saints as an undrafted free agent in 2013.

== Early life ==
Reddick attended New Bern High School in New Bern, North Carolina, and also attended Hargrave Military Academy in Chatham, Virginia. He was a varsity starter as a sophomore at fullback, and earned offensive MVP honors in the 2007 North Carolina 4AA state championship, after scoring two touchdowns to end Charlotte Independence's reign. He was named the Coastal Conference defensive player of the year, and earned first-team all-state honors at linebacker as a senior. He recorded 189 tackles, eight sacks, six forced fumbles and blocked four punts, and also rushed for 163 yards and six touchdowns at fullback, and he earned all-conference and all-area honors as a junior.

Considered a three-star recruit by Rivals.com, he was listed as the no. 33 outside linebacker in the nation. He accepted a scholarship offer from North Carolina over offers from North Carolina State, Virginia and Clemson. Reddick did not qualify for NCAA eligibility in 2008, leading him to enroll at Hargrave Military Academy. Once eligible to enroll in 2009, he was considered a four-star recruit by both Rivals.com and Scout.com.

College recruiting
Name	Hometown	School	Height	Weight	40^{‡}	Commit date
Kevin Reddick; LB	New Bern, NC	Hargrave Military Academy	6 ft 2 in (1.88 m)	230 lb (100 kg)	4.65	Aug 9, 2008
Kevin Reddick; LB	Recruit ratings: Scout: Rivals: (78)					
Overall recruit ranking: Scout: 5 Rivals: 6
‡ Refers to 40-yard dash; Note: In many cases, Scout, Rivals, 247Sports, On3, and ESPN may conflict in their listings of height, weight and 40 time.; In these cases, the average was taken. ESPN grades are on a 100-point scale.; Sources: "North Carolina Commit List for 2009". Rivals.; "RecruitTracker 2008: North Carolina". ESPN.; "2009 Team Ranking". Rivals.com.

== College career ==
During his tenure, he played in 50 games, accumulating 275 tackles, including 36 for loss, 8.5 sacks, two interception and two forced fumbles. As a senior, he was named first-team All-ACC.

== Professional career ==
=== New Orleans Saints ===
Reddick was signed as an undrafted free agent by the New Orleans Saints on April 27, 2013. The Saints released Reddick on August 26, 2014.

=== San Diego Chargers ===
Reddick signed with the San Diego Chargers on September 23, 2014, and was released October 7, 2014.

=== Carolina Panthers ===
Reddick signed with the Carolina Panthers in September 2014. He was released by the Panthers on August 30, 2015, as part of the first wave of roster cuts.

=== Buffalo Bills ===
Reddick was claimed off waivers by the Buffalo Bills on September 1, 2015, due to injuries to their linebacking unit. He was released by the Bills on September 5, 2015. On September 6, 2015, the Bills signed Reddick to their practice squad. On November 24, 2015, he was released from practice squad. On December 1, 2015, he was signed to the active roster.

On August 7, 2016, the Bills waived/injured Reddick due to a knee injury. After going unclaimed, he was placed on the team's injured reserve.
