= Sinisa Malesevic =

Irish academic

Sinisa Malesevic MRIA, MAE
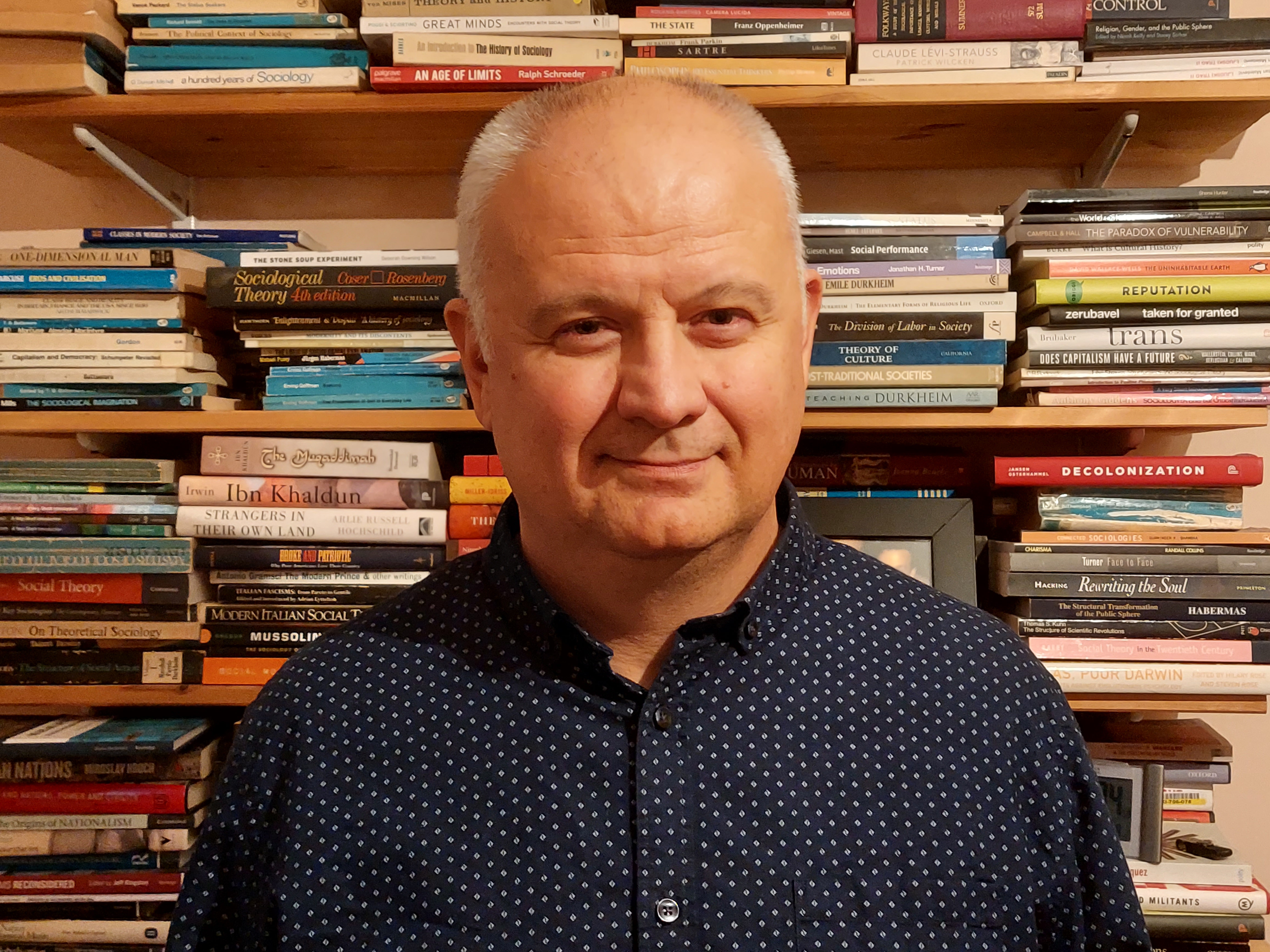
- Born: April 5, 1969 (age 57); Banja Luka, SR Bosnia and Herzegovina, SFR Yugoslavia
- Citizenship: Irish
- Occupation: Professor of Comparative Historical Sociology
- Awards: ASA outstanding book award (2018), Stein Rokkan Prize honorable mention (2020); ASA outstanding book award (2023) and Robin M. Williams, Jr. Award (2023)

Academic background
- Education: Lancaster University, Central European University, University College, Cork
- Academic advisors: Ernest Gellner, John A. Hall, Kieran Keohane

Academic work
- Discipline: historical sociology, sociological theory
- Sub-discipline: nationalism studies, war studies, political violence
- Institutions: University College Dublin
- Main interests: nations and nationalism, sociology of war and violence, sociological theory
- Notable works: Why Humans Fight (2022), Grounded Nationalisms (2019), The Rise of Organized Brutality (2017), The Sociology of War and Violence (2010);
- Notable ideas: grounded nationalism, organized brutality, normative and operative ideology, social pugnacity

Siniša Malešević, MRIA, MAE (born 5 April 1969 in Banja Luka) is a Yugoslav born Irish Full Professor and Chair of Sociology at the University College, Dublin, Ireland. He is also a Senior Fellow and Associate Researcher at Conservatoire national des arts et métiers (CNAM), Paris, France.

== Education ==
Professor Malešević completed his high school education at the New Bern High School, North Carolina, USA in 1988. He graduated in sociology from the University of Zagreb, Croatia in 1993. He received his MA from the Lancaster University, UK and the Central European University, Prague, Czech Republic in 1995. He subsequently completed his PhD in sociology from the University College Cork, Ireland in 1999 [1].

== Career and research interests ==
Professor Malešević's research interests include the comparative-historical and theoretical study of ethnicity, nation-states, nationalism, empires, ideology, war, violence and sociological theory.

Previously he held research and teaching appointments at the Institute for International Relations (Zagreb), the Centre for the Study of Nationalism, CEU (Prague)- where he worked with late Ernest Gellner -, and at the University of Galway. He also held visiting professorships and fellowships at the Université libre de Bruxelles (Eric Remacle Chair in Conflict and Peace Studies), the Institute for Human Sciences, Vienna, the London School of Economics, Uppsala University, the Netherlands Institute for Advanced Study in the Humanities and Social Sciences, Amsterdam, the Australian Defence College, Canberra and the Centre for Subjectivity Research, University of Copenhagen[1].

In March 2010 he was elected a Member of the Royal Irish Academy, in December 2012 he was elected associated member of Academy of Sciences and Arts of Bosnia and Herzegovina and in August 2014 he was elected a Member of Academia Europaea [2].

== Publications ==
Prof. Malešević is author of eleven and editor of nine books and volumes including monographs Ideology, Legitimacy and the New State (2002), The Sociology of Ethnicity (2004), Identity as Ideology (2006) The Sociology of War and Violence (2010), Nation-States and Nationalisms (2013), The Rise of Organised Brutality (2017), Grounded Nationalisms (2019), Why Humans Fight (2022) and Nationalism as a Way of Life (2025). The Rise of Organised Brutality is a recipient of the 2018 outstanding book award from the American Sociological Association's Peace, War and Social Conflict Section [3], 'Grounded Nationalisms' was a runner up (honourable mention) in 2020 Stein Rokkan Prize for Comparative Social Science Research while 'Why Humans Fight' was winner of the 2023 outstanding book award from the American Sociological Association (PWSC section) and has also been shortlisted as a finalist for the 2023 Conflict Research Society book prize. Nationalism as a Way of Life received honourable mention in the 2026 Hendley Bull Book Prize. In 2023 Prof. Malešević received Robin M. Williams, Jr. Award for Distinguished Contributions to Scholarship, Teaching, and Service, from the American Sociological Association [4] [5].

He has also authored over 150 peer-reviewed journal articles and book chapters and has given more than 250 invited talks all over the world [2].

His work has been translated into numerous languages including Albanian, Arabic, Armenian, Azerbaijani, Chinese (simplified and traditional), Croatian, French, Japanese, Persian, Portuguese, Serbian, Spanish, Turkish, and Russian.

== Selected publications ==
- (2002). Ideology, Legitimacy and the New State: Yugoslavia, Serbia and Croatia. London: Routledge (Serbian and Croatian translation 2004).
- (2004). The Sociology of Ethnicity. London: Sage (Serbian translation 2009; Persian translation 2011, 2012 and 2026; Turkish translation 2019, Chinese translation forthcoming in 2027).
- (2006). Identity as Ideology: Understanding Ethnicity and Nationalism. New York: Palgrave Macmillan (Persian translation 2017).
- (2007). Ernest Gellner and Contemporary Social Thought. Cambridge: Cambridge University Press (co-edited with M. Haugaard).
- (2010). The Sociology of War and Violence. Cambridge: Cambridge University Press (Croatian translation 2011; Turkish translation 2018; Persian translation 2021; Chinese translation 2021; Arabic translation 2021; Russian translation 2025, Spanish translation forthcoming in 2027).
- (2011). Sociological Theory and Warfare. Stockholm: Forsvarshogskolan (Spanish translation 2015).
- (2013). Nationalism and War. Cambridge: Cambridge University Press (co-edited with J.A. Hall) (Spanish translation forthcoming in 2027).
- (2013). Nation-States and Nationalisms: Organisation, Ideology and Solidarity. Cambridge: Polity (Croatian translation 2017, Arabic translation forthcoming in 2027; Persian translation forthcoming in 2027).
- (2017). The Rise of Organised Brutality: A Historical Sociology of Violence. Cambridge: Cambridge University Press (Spanish translation 2020; Arabic translation 2023, Turkish translation 2023, Chinese translation forthcoming in 2027).
- (2019). Grounded Nationalisms: A Sociological Analysis. Cambridge: Cambridge University Press (Croatian translation 2021, Spanish translation forthcoming in 2027).
- (2021). Classical Sociological Theory. London: Sage (with S. Loyal).
- (2021). Contemporary Sociological Theory. London: Sage (with S. Loyal) (Persian translation forthcoming in 2027).
- (2022). Why Humans Fight: The Social Dynamics of Close-Range Violence. Cambridge: Cambridge University Press (Arabic translation 2024; Chinese (traditional/Taiwan) translation 2026; Croatian translation forthcoming in 2026; Spanish translation forthcoming in 2027.
- (2025). Nationalism as a Way of Life: The Rise and Transformation of Modern Subjectivities. Cambridge: Cambridge University Press.

== Personal life ==
Prof. Malešević is married to a fellow sociologist Vesna Malešević (nee Josipović), who teaches at the University of Galway and they have two sons, Luka and Alex. In 2017, he has signed the Declaration on the Common Language of the Croats, Serbs, Bosniaks and Montenegrins.

== Sources ==
- [1] http://www.ucd.ie/research/people/sociology/professorsinisamalesevic/
  - [2] http://www.ucd.ie/warstudies/members/siniamaleevic/
  - [3] http://www.asanet.org/asa-communities/asa-sections/current-sections/peace-war-and-social-conflict/section-peace-war-and-social-conflict-past-award-recipients
  - [4] https://www.ucd.ie/sociology/newsandevents/latestnews/grounded-nationalisms-2020-rokkan/
  - [5] https://www.ucd.ie/sociology/newsandevents/latestnews/
  - https://ecpr.eu/news/news/details/611
- https://sinisa2malesevic.wordpress.com/
- https://www.ria.ie/sinisa-malesevic
- https://anubih.ba/index.php/bs/clanstvo/clanovi
- http://www.ae-info.org/ae/User/Malesevic_Sinisa
- https://esd.cnam.fr/membres/sinisa-malesevic-1114070.kjsp?RH=1570546542219
- https://elpais.com/cultura/2020/08/27/babelia/1598517337_524599.html
