= Montario Hardesty =

American football player and coach (born 1987)

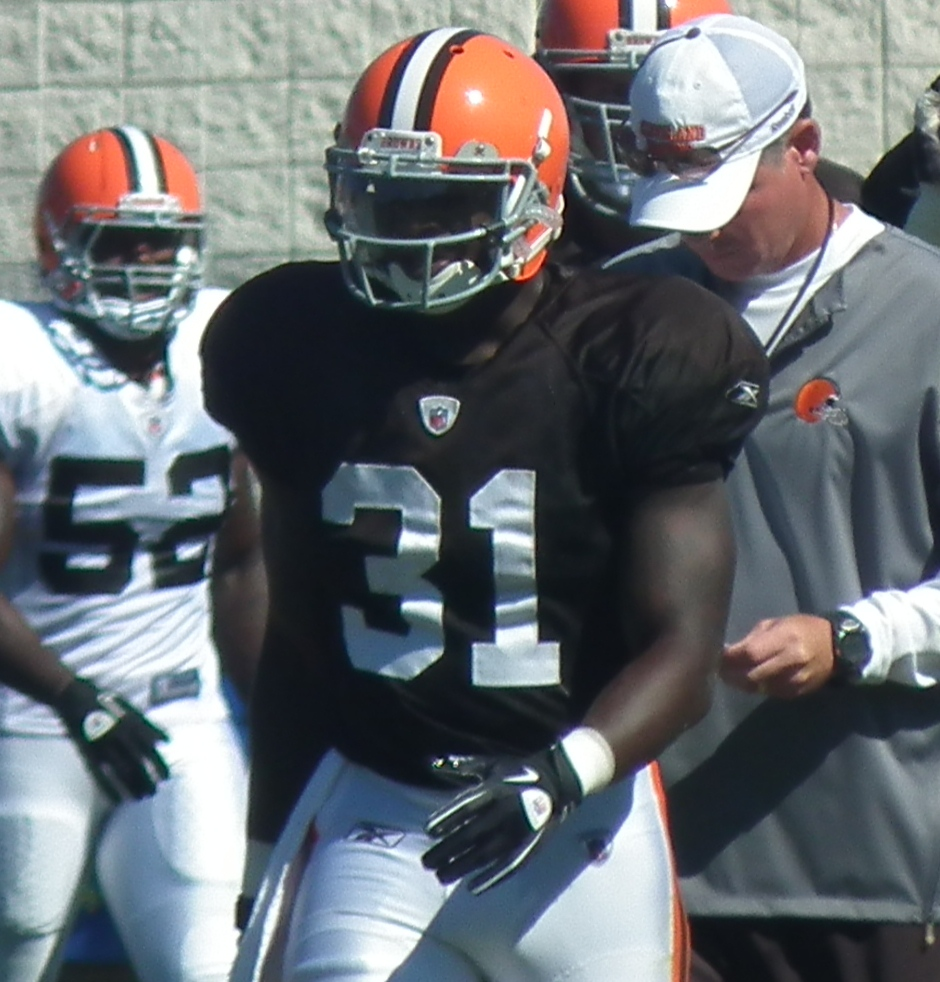
- Hardesty with the Cleveland Browns in 2011

No. 31, 20
- Position: Running back

Personal information
- Born: February 1, 1987 (age 39); New Bern, North Carolina, U.S.
- Listed height: 6 ft 0 in (1.83 m)
- Listed weight: 225 lb (102 kg)

Career information
- High school: New Bern
- College: Tennessee (2005–2009)
- NFL draft: 2010: 2nd round, 59th overall pick

Career history

Playing
- Cleveland Browns (2010–2013)

Coaching
- Norfolk State (2015–2016) Special teams coordinator & running backs coach; Florida Atlantic (2017) Assistant strength and conditioning coach; Tennessee (2018) Quality control coach; Charlotte (2019–2020) Wide receivers coach; South Carolina (2021–2023) Running backs coach

Awards and highlights
- Second-team All-SEC (2009); 2009 Shrine Bowl Offensive MVP

Career NFL statistics
- Rushing attempts: 153
- Rushing yards: 537
- Rushing touchdowns: 1
- Receptions: 16
- Receiving yards: 138
- Stats at Pro Football Reference

Montario Hardesty (born February 1, 1987) is an American college football coach and former professional running back. Hardesty played college football at the University of Tennessee, where he amassed fewer than 400 yards in each of his first four seasons before breaking out with 1,345 yards and 13 rushing touchdowns in 2009. In 2015, Hardesty became the running backs coach and special teams coordinator for Norfolk State University. He was the wide receivers coach for the Charlotte 49ers football program from 2019 to 2020, and the running backs coach at the University of South Carolina from 2021 to 2023.

== Early life ==
Hardesty played football at New Bern High School. As a senior in 2004, he rushed for 2,002 yards on 272 carries. He had 19 rushing touchdowns. He was considered a four-star recruit and ranked 100th on the Rivals.com's list of the top 100 players in the class of 2005. He was recruited as an "athlete", with the potential to play both running back and safety. Hardesty was considered a four-star recruit by Rivals.com. He chose to play for the University of Tennessee.

== College career ==
Hardesty was a three-year letter winner at Tennessee. He amassed 2,391 rushing yards on 560 attempts, 405 receiving yards on 38 receptions, and 26 total touchdowns.

Hardesty was granted a medical hardship for the 2005 season because of a knee injury he suffered against Ole Miss. He rushed 6 times for 18 yards before his injury. In 2006, Hardesty started the season with a 43-yard touchdown run against the University of California. His best game of the season was a 72-yard performance against the Air Force Academy. He played in 13 games. He finished the season with 384 rushing yards and four touchdowns.

Hardesty's 2007 season wasn't quite as good as his 2006 season. He had a touchdown in the opening game of the season against the University of California once again. He finished the year with 373 rushing yards and 3 touchdowns. 2008 was the worst statistical season of Hardesty's career at Tennessee. He ran for 271 yards, finishing the season with 6 touchdowns. He passed the 1,000 career rushing yard mark against Vanderbilt University in the season's next-to-last game.

In 2009, Hardesty was 20th in the NCAA's Division I-FBS division in rushing yards, with 1345 yards in 13 games. He started the season off with 160 rushing yards and 1 touchdown against Western Kentucky University. He has passed the 100 rushing yard mark four more times in the 2009 season, against Ohio University, the University of South Carolina, Vanderbilt University, and the University of Kentucky. He was the Southeastern Conference's fourth leading rusher in the 2009 season with 1,345 yards. Hardesty was first in the SEC in carries with 282.

=== Statistics ===
Season	Rushing					Receiving				
Season	Att	Yds	Avg	Lng	TD	Rec	Yds	Avg	Lng	TD
2005	6	18	3.0	11	0	0	0	0.0	0	0
2006	107	384	3.6	43	4	6	54	9.0	23	0
2007	89	373	4.2	26	3	3	25	8.3	21	0
2008	76	271	3.6	27	6	4	24	6.0	12	0
2009	282	1,345	4.8	43	13	25	302	12.1	47	1
Career	560	2,391	4.3	43	26	38	405	10.7	47	1

=== Track and field ===
Hardesty was also a standout athlete at New Bern High School. He was a state 100 meters finalist in 2003. He decided not to run track and field at the University of Tennessee. His personal bests are 10.36 seconds in the 100 meters and 21.65 seconds in the 200 meters.

Personal bests

Event	Time (seconds)	Venue	Date
100 meters	10.36	Greensboro, North Carolina	July 26, 2004
200 meters	21.65	Greensboro, North Carolina	July 26, 2004

== Professional career ==
Hardesty was picked in the second round of the 2010 NFL draft by the Cleveland Browns.

Pre-draft measurables
Height	Weight	Arm length	Hand span	40-yard dash	20-yard shuttle	Three-cone drill	Vertical jump	Broad jump	Bench press
6 ft 0 in (1.83 m)	225 lb (102 kg)	31 in (0.79 m)	9 1/2	4.49 s	4.14 s	6.87 s	41 in (1.04 m)	10 ft 4 in (3.15 m)	21 reps
All values from NFL Combine

Hardesty was expected to compete for the starting running back position for the Browns, but was limited in pre-season due to injury. On September 2, in his first pre-season game against the Chicago Bears, he suffered a torn left ACL, sidelining him for the entire 2010 season.

In the 2011 season, Hardesty played in ten games and finished with 88 carries for 266 rushing yards and 14 receptions for 122 yards. In the 2012 season, Hardesty had 65 carries for 271 yards and one touchdown. His one touchdown occurred in Week 6 against the Bengals.

On August 27, 2013, Hardesty was placed on injured reserve, effectively ending his 2013 NFL season. He was released on September 30.
