= Turell =

Turell or Turèll is the surname of the following people:

- Dan Turèll (1946–1993), Danish writer
- Jane Colman Turell (1708–1735), American colonial poet
- Ryan Turell (born 1999), American basketball player in the Israeli Basketball Premier League
- Samuel Turell Armstrong (1784–1850), American political figure
- Saul J. Turell (1921–1986), American producer and maker of documentaries

== See also ==
- Turrell (name)
