= Allene Wilson Groves =

23rd president general of the Daughters of the American Revolution

Allene Wison Groves

23rd President General of the National Society Daughters of the American Revolution
- In office 1956–1959
- Preceded by: Gertrude Sprague Carraway
- Succeeded by: Doris Pike White

Personal details
- Born: May 24, 1896 Cape Girardeau, Missouri, U.S.
- Died: August 27, 1986 (aged 90)
- Spouse: Frederic A. Groves
- Children: 2
- Education: Missouri State Normal School; University of Wisconsin

Allene Wilson Groves (May 24, 1896 – August 27, 1986) was an American civic leader who served as the 23rd president general of the Daughters of the American Revolution from 1956 to 1959.

== Early life and education ==
Groves was born Allene Wilson on May 24, 1896, in Cape Girardeau, Missouri to Judge Robert Love Wilson and Jane Allen Wilson. Her mother was an organizing member and later the regent of the Nancy Hunter Chapter of the Daughters of the American Revolution. Groves descended from prominent Maryland and Virginian families, and her pioneer ancestors migrated to Kentucky and later Missouri.

She attended Missouri State Normal School for two years before completing her studies at the University of Wisconsin.

== Career ==
After graduating from college, Groves worked for the United States federal government in Washington, D.C. for a few years.

=== Daughters of the American Revolution ===
Groves joined the Daughters of the American Revolution (DAR) in 1936 as a member of the Nancy Hunter Chapter in Cape Girardeau. She served as the State Vice Regent and State Regent of the Missouri DAR and as vice president general. Her main project as state regent was restoring the interior of the Arrow Rock Tavern. She also served as State and National promoter of the Children of the American Revolution.

In 1955, she ran as DAR first vice president general on the ticket of president general-hopeful Gertrude Gilpin Richards. Following Richards' unexpected death, Groves was selected by the DAR National Board of Management to replace her as the candidate for president general. During the election, a tea was held in her honor by Mrs. William H. Sullivan at Wayside Cottage in Scarsdale, New York. She was elected, defeating two opponents, in a run-off ballet n April 21, 1956, during the national society's 65th Continental Congress. She was installed as president general on April 22, 1956. She received 1,135 votes while her Mrs. Thomas Henry Lee of Philadelphia received 417 votes and Mrs. Charles C. Haig of Washington received 312. Her first act as president general was draping the white sash for honorary president generals on her predecessor Gertrude Sprague Carraway.

During her term as president general, the Allene Wilson Groves Cottage for Little Girls at Tamassee DAR School in South Carolina was dedicated in her honor on October 26, 1958.

In 1957, Groves spoke out against hate speech and told members of the national society to "be careful" about what they say, stating that the organization and its members "never indulge in persecution of minorities" following a guest speaker, Rear Admiral John G. Crommelin, making anti-Semitic remarks at a DAR event in Pensacola, Florida, prompting members to walk out of the event.

In 1958, Ilse Naujoks, an 18-year-old student from Marlborough, Massachusetts was selected by her school for the Daughters of the American Revolution's Good Citizenship Award but was denied the award by the organization because, a daughter of German refugees, she had never been naturalized. When questioned, Groves explained the ban on non-citizens receiving the award, sating: "It is natural to assume that a good-citizenship award in a high school in the U.S. would go to a citizen of this country."

In 1959, she was awarded the Constructive Citizenship Medal by the Sons of the American Revolution. That same year, she gave a speech titled "Faith of Our Fathers Living Still" at Southern Seminary in Buena Vista, Virginia.

== Personal life and death ==
She married the businessman Frederic Alquin Groves in 1921. They had two daughters: Jane (who died in 1924) and Marjorie.

She died on August 27, 1986, and was buried at Lorimer Cemetery in Cape Girardeau.
