= Little Big Mom =

- The Simpsons episode
- Episode no.: Season 11; Episode 10
- Directed by: Mark Kirkland
- Written by: Carolyn Omine
- Production code: BABF04
- Original air date: January 9, 2000

Guest appearance
- Elwood Edwards as Virtual Doctor

Episode features
- Chalkboard gag: "I will not create art from dung"
- Couch gag: The Simpsons are a family of crash test dummies that get slammed into the TV as part of the test. The Homer dummy's head falls off from the sudden trauma.
- Commentary: Mike Scully; George Meyer; Matt Selman; Carolyn Omine; Mark Kirkland

Episode chronology
← Previous "Grift of the Magi"	Next → "Faith Off"
- The Simpsons season 11

"Little Big Mom" is the tenth episode of the eleventh season of the American animated television series The Simpsons. It originally aired on the Fox network in the United States on January 9, 2000, the first episode of the show to air in the 2000s. It was directed by Mark Kirkland and was the first episode Carolyn Omine wrote for the show. In the episode, while the rest of the Simpson family goes skiing, Marge remains at the ski lodge due to her fear of skiing, only to break her leg from a falling clock. As a result, while hospitalized, Marge leaves Lisa to take care of the house. When Bart and Homer refuse to help out with the chores, Lisa pulls a prank on them by making it look like they have leprosy.

The episode includes a guest appearance from Elwood Edwards, and features several references to Lucille Ball and her television work.

== Plot ==
Homer stops Marge from throwing away the junk in the attic. When he finds some never-used skis among the junk, he decides to take the family on a skiing holiday. Marge stays in the ski lodge, not wanting to risk injury on the slopes, but is hit by a clock falling off a wall and suffers a broken leg.

As Marge recovers in the hospital, Lisa confidently declares that she, Homer, and Bart can keep the house in order. However, Homer and Bart prove to be of no help and the house quickly becomes a mess. When Lisa calls Marge and asks her to come home, Marge lies and says she is not yet well enough to be discharged; in truth, she is enjoying her time away from doing housework.

Exasperated at the slovenly behavior of her father and brother, Lisa is visited by the ghost of Lucille Ball and takes her advice for a scheme to get revenge on them. While Homer and Bart sleep, Lisa uses a mixture of oatmeal and green paint to apply fake sores to their skin, throwing them into a panic once they wake up. Lisa uses a medical website to trick them into thinking they have contracted leprosy, then suggests that they clean up the house in order to reduce the chance of spreading it. Instead, Homer and Bart flee to Ned Flanders' house, again leaving Lisa to clean up the mess at home.

By the time Marge leaves the hospital, Homer and Bart are nowhere to be found. Ned reveals that he and his family sent them to a treatment center on Molokai, in Hawaii, so Marge and Lisa fly there. Homer and Bart have figured out that they do not actually have leprosy, but are keeping up the deception in order to have a free vacation despite the painful treatments they must endure. The family settles in to enjoy their time on Molokai as Homer screams in agony, ending the episode.

== Production ==
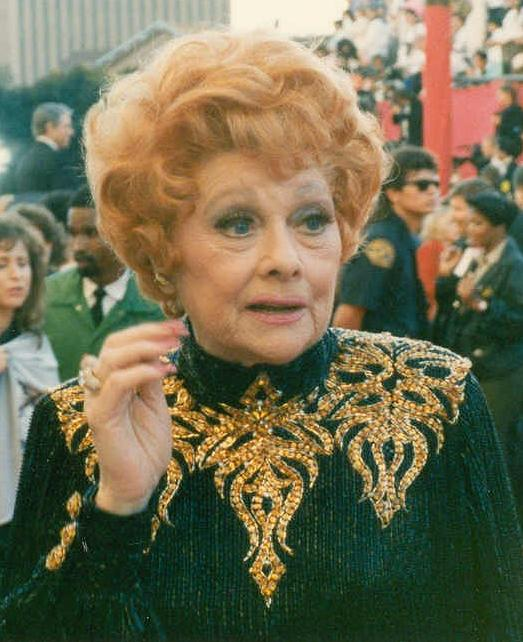
Actress Lucille Ball, seen here just four weeks before her death in 1989, is referenced in the episode.

"Little Big Mom" was written by Carolyn Omine and directed by Mark Kirkland as part of the eleventh season of The Simpsons (1999–2000). Elwood Edwards, known as the voice of the Internet service provider America Online, guest starred in the episode as the Virtual Doctor that confirms Homer and Bart's leprosy.

Omine recalled in a retrospective that it was George Meyer who came up with the premise of Marge (ironically) injuring herself at a ski lodge. The scene where Ned Flanders shows up in skintight skiing uniform came about when one of the show's other writers began "talking about how there are those skiers who are really serious about skiing — the skiers who wear those skin-tight suits as if they're on an Olympic team. We'd done the joke before about Flanders having this amazing body, so it became Flanders in a super sexy ski outfit. We knew we wanted Flanders to make Homer uncomfortable, so we had him shaking his butt and saying, 'It feels like I’m wearing nothing at all!'" Both that line and the similarly iconic "Stupid, sexy Flanders" were in the initial draft of the script, though Omine admitted she could not remember if she came up with it, or if someone else threw it out while helping outline the episode's story.

She also commented, "When we first came up with the joke, we said that his ass should be really shapely — we made that clear. But when we got the animation back we wondered, 'Is it too much?' After a while we decided to just go for it and that was definitely the right call. Flanders is very hot — he should show it off."

The episode features several references to the late American actress Lucille Ball and her many television sitcoms starring characters named Lucy. For example, it is the ghost of Ball who gives Lisa the idea to trick Homer and Bart into thinking they have leprosy. Ball is portrayed with a cigarette in her hand in that scene, and speaks with a raspy voice. When Lisa first sees the ghost, she cries out "Lucy?", to which Ball responds "Lucy McGillicuddy Ricardo Carmichael. [Coughs] And I think there's some more." According to Michael Karol, author of the 2004 book Lucy A to Z, the last names "are those of Ball's characters from I Love Lucy and The Lucy Show. Left out were Lucy Carter of Here's Lucy and Lucy Barker of Life with Lucy." The Simpsons cast member Tress MacNeille provided the voice of Ball in the episode. Additional references to Ball's work featured in "Little Big Mom" include Homer and Bart watching I Love Lucy with the volume turned up high, disturbing Lisa when she is trying to sleep. An Itchy & Scratchy cartoon that references the "Job Switching" episode of I Love Lucy is also seen in the episode.

== Reception ==
The episode originally aired on the Fox network in the United States on January 9, 2000. On October 7, 2008, it was released on DVD as part of the box set The Simpsons – The Complete Eleventh Season. Staff members Mike Scully, George Meyer, Matt Selman, Carolyn Omine, and Mark Kirkland participated in the DVD audio commentary for the episode. Deleted scenes from the episode were also included on the box set.

While reviewing the eleventh season of The Simpsons, DVD Movie Guide's Colin Jacobson commented: "We've seen 'the family goes to crap without Marge around' episodes in the past, so don't expect any reinvented wheels here. Still, the sight of Lisa in charge adds a decent spin, and the leprosy twist – while silly – proves amusing. It’s another unexceptional show but one with its moments."

Before this episode, The Simpsons had referenced Lucille Ball several times. Michael Karol wrote in Lucy A to Z that "perhaps the funniest tribute came in ... 'Little Big Mom.'" Dan Castellaneta, who provides the voice of Homer in the series, considers this episode to be one of his personal favorites.

The "Stupid Sexy Flanders" sequence has become a popular Internet meme. Don Caldwell, editor-in-chief of Know Your Meme, stated, "It's not in the top five Simpsons memes" but "it's a pretty big meme as far as Simpsons memes go", explaining "this scene in particular is very memorable and it's really simple and versatile, which is why it has such power as a meme." Entertainment writer Tyler Vendetti commented, "The image of Flanders' ass, as well as him saying, 'It feels like I'm wearing nothing at all,' gets stuck in Homer's head in that episode, but it also gets stuck in your head as a viewer, which is why I think that joke has become so popular online."

Because "Little Big Mom" deals with leprosy, it has never been released in Japan. "Little Big Mom" is one of two episodes that never aired in Japan (the other being season 10 episode "Thirty Minutes over Tokyo"). According to Shari Ross Altarac in her doctoral dissertation "The Adaptation of U.S. Television in Foreign Markets: How France and Japan Put Their Distinctive Spin on The Simpsons", the reason behind this is that "Former segregation laws remain a sensitive topic in Japan, where litigation of leprosy cases and charges of human rights abuses by the Japanese government have ensued" (see Leprosy in Japan). At the time the episode aired in January 2000, the Japanese government was even facing numerous lawsuits from former leprosy patients which began in 1998; these lawsuits would not conclude until 2001.
