= Order of the First Families of Virginia =

Lineage society

The Order of the First Families of Virginia was instituted on 11 May 1912 "to promote historical, biographical, and genealogical researches concerning Virginia history during the period when she was the only one of the thirteen original colonies."

== Membership ==
The Order of the First Families of Virginia states its membership criteria as follows:

Membership is limited to lineal descendants of an ancestor who aided in the establishment of the first permanent English colony, Virginia 1607-1624. This aid may also have been rendered by members of the Virginia Company of London if followed by subsequent residence in the Colony of Virginia by such member or his descendants for one or more generations.

The Order of the First Families of Virginia does not enter into correspondence with those inquiring in their own behalf, nor is membership information furnished. Proposals for membership made by members by request of candidates are not acceptable, and requests for membership are considered inappropriate.

Membership is strictly by invitation only.

No membership list is made available. However, the Order of the First Families of Virginia sponsors the publication of Adventurers of Purse and Person, which provides genealogical information on early colonists through the first six generations. The most recent edition is the Fourth, edited by the Order's genealogist John Frederick Dorman and published in three volumes, 2004–2007, to celebrate the four hundredth anniversary of the founding of Jamestown. Two groups of colonists are included: 1. Virginia Company shareholders "who either came to Virginia themselves between 1607-1624/4, and had descendants, or who did not come to Virginia within that period but whose grandchildren were resident there;" and 2. "Immigrants to Virginia ..., 1607-1624/5, who left descendants."

Since the membership criteria of the Order of the First Families of Virginia is broadly similar to the stated inclusion criteria for Adventurers of Purse and Person, it follows that descendants of one or more of the "adventurers" included in the book, are also descendants of one or more of the First Families of Virginia.

One anonymous member remarked that the Order of the First Families of Virginia is "a scholarly, quiet group."

== Notable members ==
- Marion Moncure Duncan, Order President, 25th NSDAR President General
- Kathryn Slaughter Wittichen, Founder of Southern Dames of America, UDC President General

== See also ==
- Jamestowne Society
- The Lost Colony
