= Marguerite Courtright Patton =

21st DAR President General

21st President General of the National Society Daughters of the American Revolution
- In office 1950–1953
- Preceded by: Estella Armstrong O'Byrne
- Succeeded by: Gertrude Sprague Carraway

Ohio State Regent, Daughters of the American Revolution
- In office 1944–1947

Personal details
- Born: Marguerite Boggs Courtright; February 5, 1889 Circleville, Ohio, U.S.
- Died: June 3, 1971 (aged 82) Columbus, Ohio, U.S.
- Spouse: James Blaine Patton
- Children: 2

Marguerite Boggs Courtright Patton (February 5, 1889 – June 3, 1971) was an American civic leader and anti-communist who served as the 21st President General of the Daughters of the American Revolution from 1950 to 1953.

== Early life ==
Patton was born Marguerite Boggs Courtright on February 5, 1889, in Circleville, Ohio, to Judge Samuel W. Courtright and Jean Martin Courtright.

== Civic work ==
During World War II, Patton served on the Franklin County Defense Council and the Columbus Speakers Bureau for blood drives.

=== Daughters of the American Revolution ===
Patton joined the Washington Courthouse Chapter of the Daughters of the American Revolution (DAR) in Ohio in 1911. She went on to serve as Ohio DAR State Vice Regent, State Regent, and First Vice President General. As State Regent, from 1944 to 1947, she led the Ohio DAR in investing $12,080,710 in bonds and stamp, allocating $16,684 to the DAR War Projects Fund, and donating 5,776 buddy bags.

In 1950, Patton defeated Maymie D. Lammers of Dallas, Texas in the election to become President General of the National Society Daughters of the American Revolution. She and her administration were sworn in on April 21, 1950, in Washington, D.C. Patton's predecessor, Estella Armstrong O'Byrne, openly supported Lammers during the election. Patton put forth multiple resolutions that were adopted by the national society at the closing session of DAR Continental Congress, including ones that equated federal spending to socialism.

In 1952, Patton wrote to President Harry S. Truman on behalf of the DAR strongly urging him to pass the Immigration and Nationality Act of 1952. At the national society's 61st Continental Congress that year, Patton advocated for national defense phases and questioned foreign policy proceedings with Asian countries, including the United Nations' intentions with Korea, the Communist government in China, the exiled nationalist Chinese government in Taiwan, and the possibility of Communism spreading throughout Burma and Indo-China. She advocated for a nonpartisan survey to be administered on the matter and referred to the spread of Communism as "big scale Red invasions." She went on to say that George Washington called the United States a "Republican government" and claimed that the country is "not now and never [was] a "democracy." She claimed that Communist groups were adopting the term democracy to identify their cause. She was accused of wanting the United States to withdraw from the United Nations, to which she responded that the United Nations "has a socialistic trend" but she had "never made the statement [to withdraw] at any time."

During her term as president general, Patton introduced the observance of national defense night at Continental Congress, toured multiple military training centers, and had air raid drills and fire drills performed regularly at DAR Headquarters. Following the end of her term, she served as Chairwoman of the National Defense Committee from 1953 to 1956.

== Personal life and death ==
On July 4, 1911, she married James B. Patton, an official with Ritter Lumber Company. They had two sons, James and Robert, who were both members of the Children of the American Revolution. The family moved to New Jersey in 1916 and then to Columbus, Ohio in 1922.

She died on June 3, 1971, and was buried in Forest Grove Cemetery.
