= Estella Weeks =

American researcher

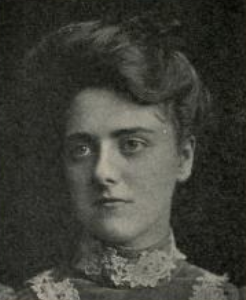
- Estella T. Weeks, from the 1906 yearbook of Teachers College, Columbia University
- Born: Estella Terry Weeks; September 6, 1886; Brooklyn, New York
- Died: October 17, 1969; Staunton, Virginia
- Occupation(s): Researcher, statistician, educator

Estella Terry Weeks (September 6, 1886 – October 17, 1969) was an American educator, statistician, and researcher, who studied reconstruction efforts after World War I, and the Shakers religious sect, among other subjects.

== Early life and education ==
Weeks was born in Brooklyn, New York, the daughter of William H. Weeks and Lydia Elizabeth Kelsey Weeks. Her father was a salesman for Brooks Brothers for over fifty years. She graduated from Long Island City High School in Queens, and studied social science at Teachers College, Columbia University.

== Career ==
Weeks taught school in New York City as a young woman. She directed a summer school in Bernardsville, New Jersey in 1915. In 1918, she was working in Washington, D.C. as assistant director of a division at the Committee on Public Information.

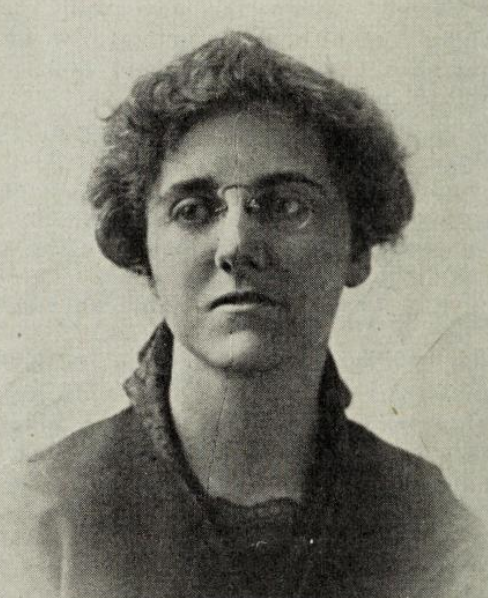
Estella T. Weeks, from a 1921 publication

Weeks was head of the research and statistics department at Hoggson Brothers, an architectural firm in New York City. She traveled to France after World War I with the American Committee for Devastated France. During World War II, she worked as a research assistant at the headquarters of the National Association of Secondary School Principals in Washington, D.C.

Weeks moved to the Berkshires with her mother for health reasons, and there became acquainted with the United Believers or "Shakers", an American religious sect. For over forty years, she studied Shaker lore, especially their music, dances, and liturgical practices. She presented a paper on this work at the National Folk Festival in Washington, D.C. in 1941, received a grant from the American Philosophical Society in 1942 to support her research, and spoke to the Hymn Society of America about her findings in 1946. She died before she finished her intended book on the subject.

== Publications ==
- A study of Long Island City, New York (1913)
- An Industrial Notebook (1919, edited by Weeks for YWCA workers)
- Reconstruction Programs: A Comparative Study Of Their Content And Of The Viewpoints Of The Issuing Organizations (1920)
- "What Construction has Meant and What it Means Today" (1921)
- Basic Project Reports of Near East Foundation Projects (1932)
- "Shakerism: Shakerism in Indiana; Notes on Shaker Life, Customs, and Music" (1945, with Ernest W. Baughman)
- "A Sketch Showing Location of the First Settlers in Hood River, Oregon" (1948, map, with Nora Ann Rumbaugh)

== Personal life and legacy ==
Weeks died in 1969, in Staunton, Virginia, at the age of 83. There is a folder of correspondence related to Weeks in the Manuscripts and Folklife Archives of Western Kentucky University.
