= Estelle Weigel =

American figure skater (1914–1967)

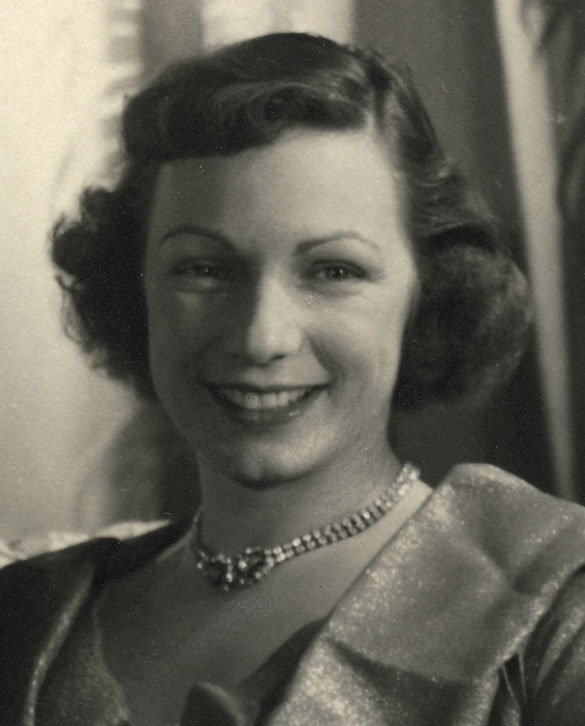

Personal information
- Full name: Estelle D. Weigel Schmitt
- Born: November 18, 1914 Buffalo, New York
- Died: March 15, 1967 (aged 52)

Figure skating career
- Country: United States

Estelle D. Weigel Schmitt (November 18, 1914 – March 15, 1967) was an American figure skater in ladies singles. Born in Buffalo, New York, she won the bronze medal at the United States Figure Skating Championships in 1934 and competed in the 1936 Winter Olympic Games. Her older sister Louise also skated in the Olympics.

On October 9, 2018, Estelle was inducted into the Greater Buffalo (NY) Sports Hall of Fame along with her sisters, Louise and Mary.

== Results ==
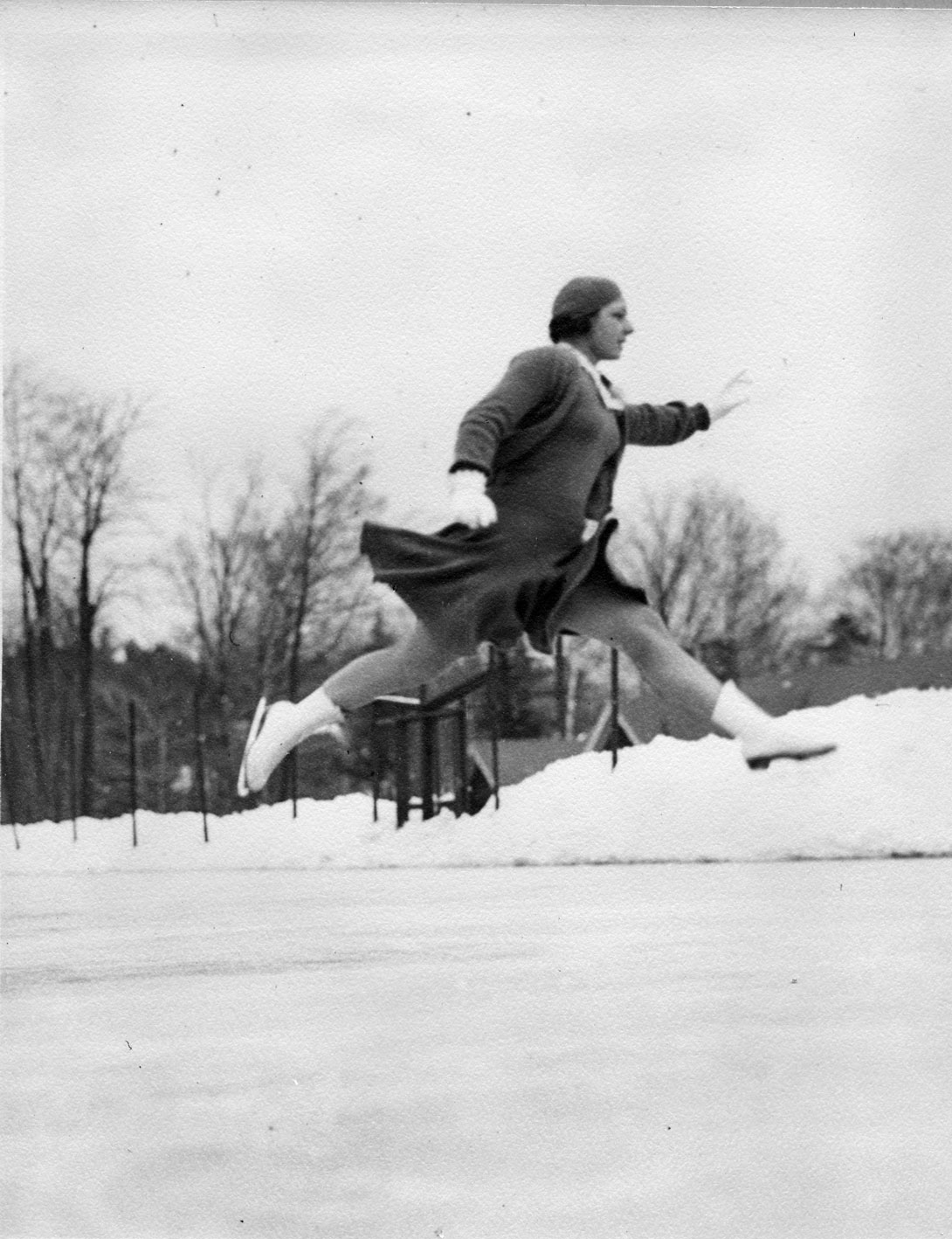
Estelle Weigel, Lake Placid, NY, 1934

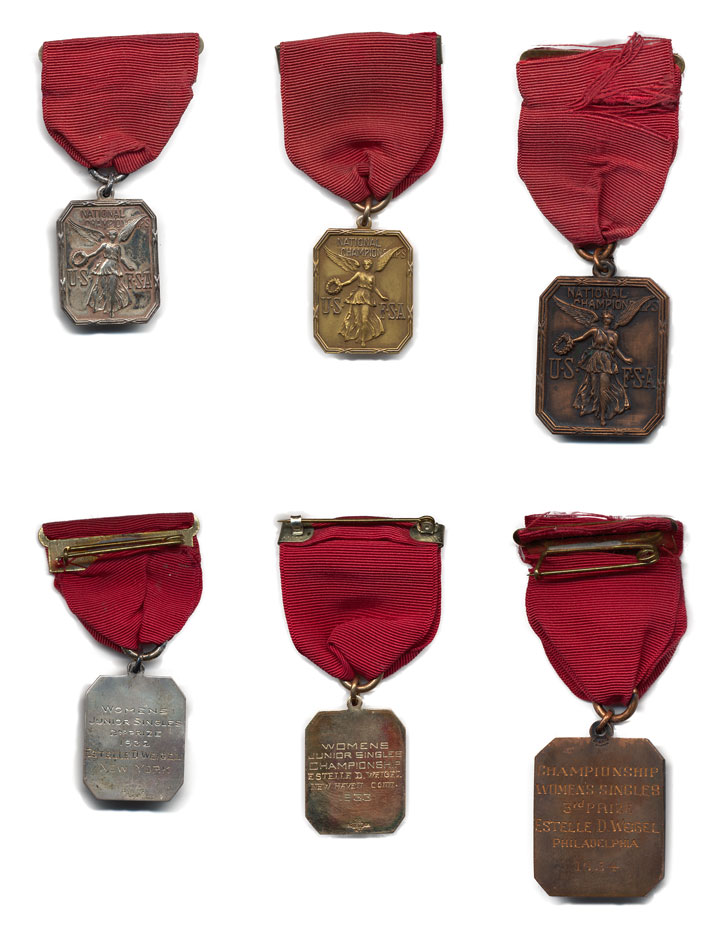
Estelle Weigel, Skating Medals (Front and Back)

Event		1932	1933	1934	1936
U.S. Championships	Juniors	2nd	1st		
Lake Placid Club - Sno-Birds Competition	Seniors			1st	
U.S. Championships	Seniors			3rd	4th
Winter Olympics					22nd
