= Estela Renner =

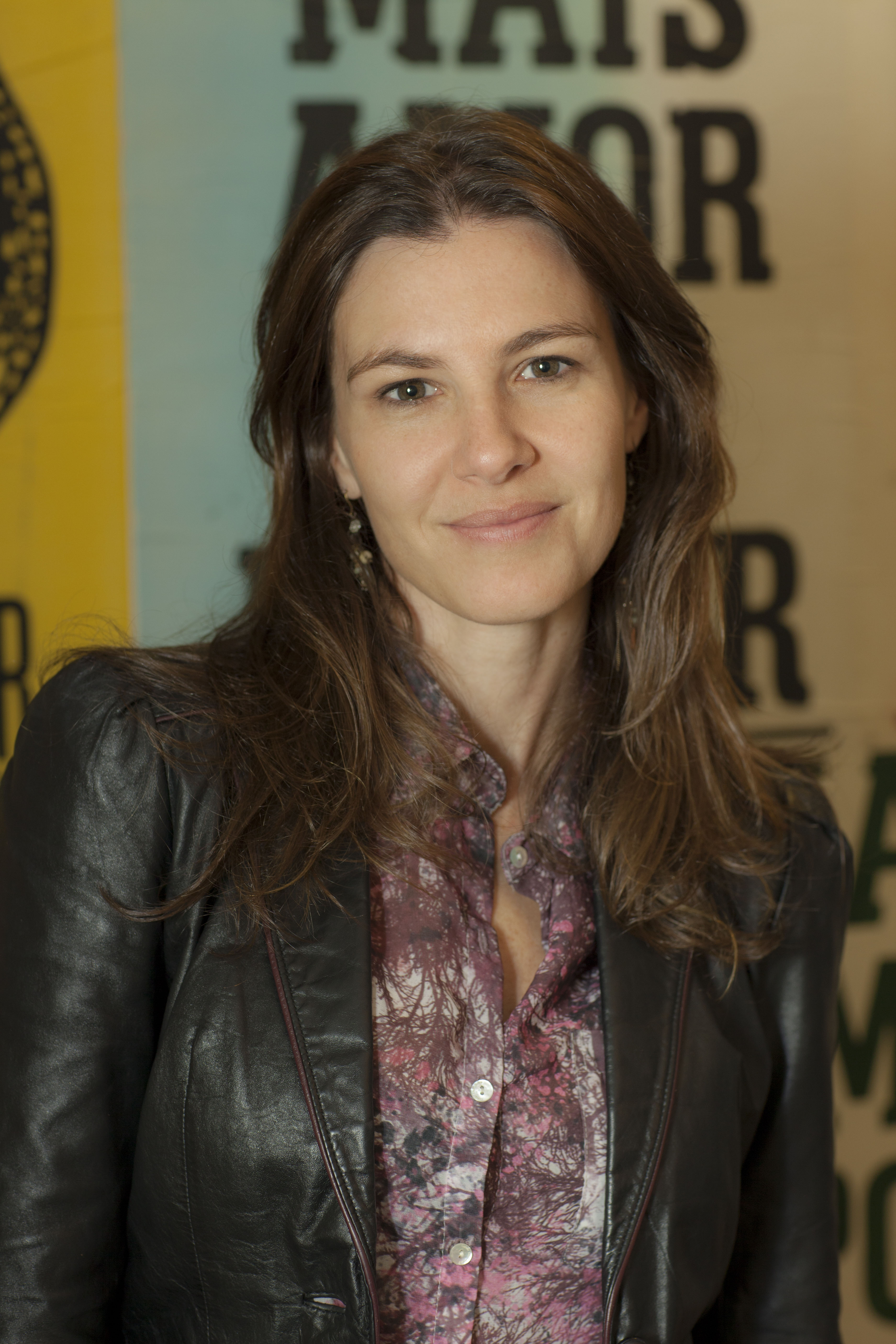
- Born: São Paulo, São Paulo, BRA
- Occupations: Director and screenwriter
- Notable credits: Criança, a Alma do Negócio; Muito Além do Peso; Target Market: Kids and Way Beyond Weight

Estela Renner is a movie director, writer, and co-founder of Maria Farinha Filmes.

== Work ==
Estela lived in the United States for seven years, where she obtained a master's degree in motion pictures, and worked in writing and directing sitcoms. Returning to Brazil, Estela dedicated her work efforts to helping promote social and environmental changes through movies. She wrote and directed Way Beyond Weight, a documentary on the epidemic of childhood obesity, and Target Market: Kids, dealing with the effects of advertising on children. Made available online, both were viewed by over two million people and had great impact on public policy making.

For TV Globo, Estela co-created and directed 10 of the 25 episodes of the series Young Inventors, (about youth in need who invent something to improve life in their communities). The series has been well-received, and, at one point, reached an audience of over 23 million people. She has been the producer of many documentaries, such as Drops of Joy, a manifesto emphasizing the importance of drastically changing the way we think and behave by valuing and embracing play in our lives, and Territory of Play, a film that weaves a tapestry out of the gestures seen in children's play throughout Brazil.

As a fiction writer, Estela is the author of She Makes Movies (Portuguese title: Ela Faz Cinema), and, for Fox International, the feature animation, Lino.

In 2016, Estela launched another documentary written and directed by her—The Beginning of Life—on the importance of human relations in the first years of a person's life.
