= Estela Domínguez =

Spanish volleyball player (born 1969)

Personal information
- Full name: Estela Domínguez
- Nationality: Spanish
- Born: November 14, 1969 (age 56); Spain

Estela Domínguez (born 14 November 1969) is a Spanish former volleyball player who competed in the 1992 Summer Olympics.
