= Elisabeth Tarras-Wahlberg =

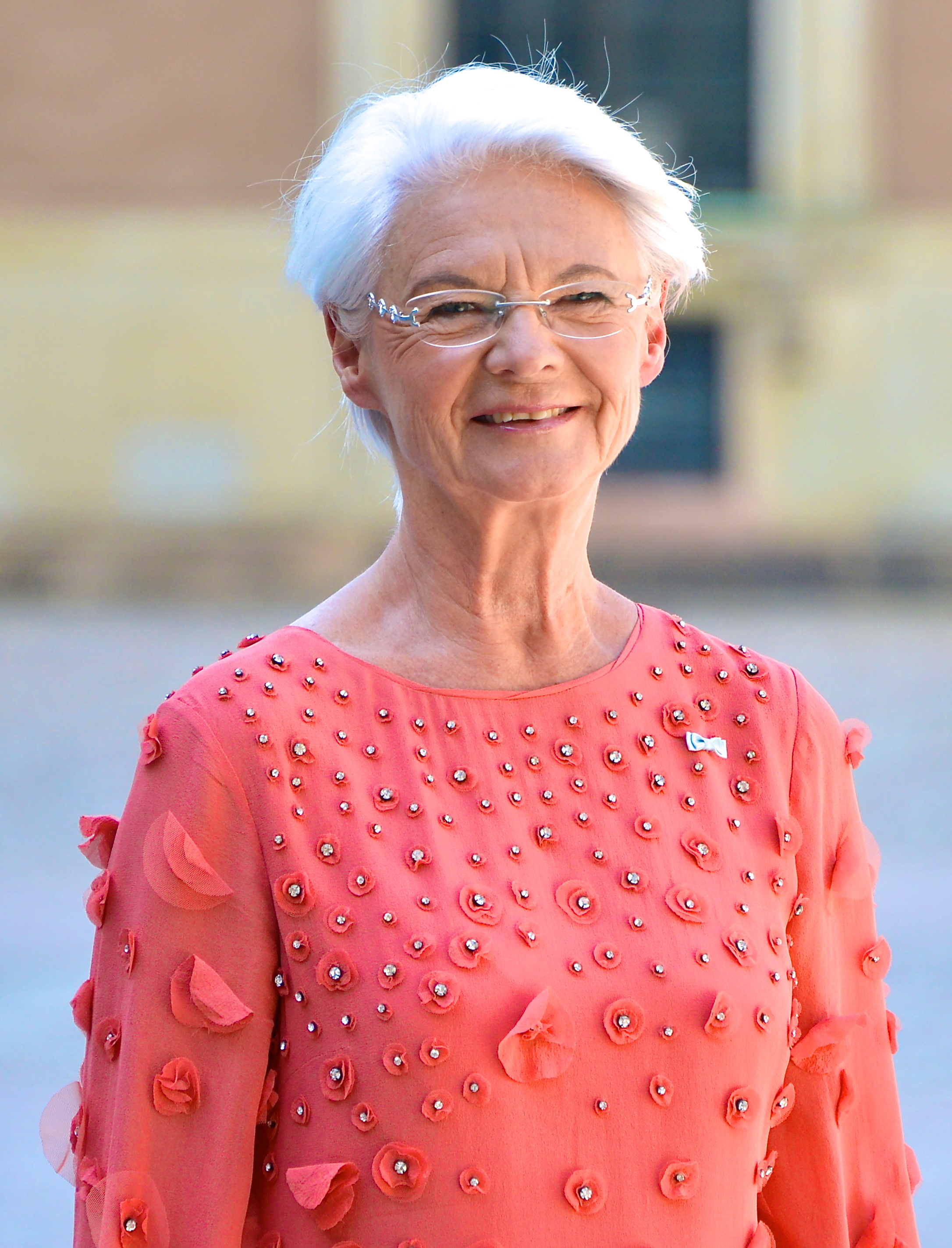
Tarras-Wahlberg arriving to the wedding of Princess Madeleine in June 2013.

Astrid Birgitta Elisabeth Tarras-Wahlberg (born von Engelhardt on September 15, 1950 in Kristianstad, Skåne County) was Press secretary to the Royal Court of Sweden from 1976 to 1995 and Director of the Press and Information Department at the Royal Court from 1995 to 2008.

In 2008 she quit her services to the Swedish royal family after 32 years of service. Her new job is to work as an international relations advisor to Emir Hamad bin Khalifa Al Thani of Qatar.

She has since 2009 returned to Sweden.

== Awards and decorations ==
- (Portugal) Commander of the Order of Prince Henry (13 January 1987)
- (Estonia) Second Class of the Order of the White Star (September 1995)
