= Estella Armstrong O'Byrne =

20th DAR President General

20th President General of the National Society Daughters of the American Revolution
- In office 1947–1950
- Preceded by: May Erwin Talmadge
- Succeeded by: Marguerite Courtright Patton

Personal details
- Born: Estella Armstrong; March 30, 1891 Shelby County, Indiana, U.S.
- Died: May 29, 1987 (aged 96) Connersville, Indiana, U.S.
- Spouse: Roscoe C. O'Byrne
- Education: Indiana University Bloomington

Estella Armstrong O'Byrne (March 30, 1891 – May 29, 1987) was an American civic leader and anti-communist. She served as the 20th President General of the Daughters of the American Revolution from 1947 to 1950. She used her position as president general to speak out against Communism and globalism.

== Early life and education ==
O'Byrne was born and raised in Indiana. She graduated from Indiana University Bloomington.

== Activism and civic life ==
O'Byrne joined the Daughters of the American Revolution (DAR) in January 1910, becoming a member of the Rushville Chapter. She helped charter two additional chapters in Indiana: the Twin Forks Chapter in Brookville and Mary Mott Green Chapter in Shelbyville. She served as the Indiana state society's recording secretary and treasurer before being elected as state regent in 1934.

On May 23, 1947, O'Byrne was elected as President General of the National Society Daughters of the American Revolution, succeeding May Erwin Talmadge. During the week of Continental Congress, at which time the election took place, she wore the same pink dress to make a memorable impression upon the delegates, which became known as the "Pink Dress Device".

Her election followed the DAR's first all-night ballot count in thirty years, which concluded that she defeated her challenger, Mrs. Stanley T. Manlove, by only 55 votes. O'Byrne received 1,186 votes and Manlove received 1,131 votes. She and her administration officers were invested during a four-hour ceremony at DAR Constitution Hall. During the ceremony, O'Byrne and the other national leaders declared support for the unification of the United States Armed Forces and went on record recommending the reading of prayer before each meeting of the United Nations.

At the opening ceremony of the DAR's 59th Continental Congress on April 17, 1950, in Washington, D.C., O'Byrne gave an address listing five issues of national concern for "all citizens" of the United States: foreign policy on China and the Far East, national defense, the national budget, anti-communism, and anti-globalism. A staunch anti-communist, she stated that strong policy is needed to prevent the country from being "swept behind the Iron Curtain" and advocated for government officials who were men "beyond suspicion or reproach regarding loyalty" to the United States. She spoke out against the communist movement in the United States, relaying multiple labor organizations' move to "purge" Communist leaders from their ranks and advocating for the Federal Bureau of Investigation to increase American loyalty investigations.

As president general, O'Byrne advocated for improvements to the DAR Schools in the mountain regions, including the addition of vocational courses. She also advocated for the construction of a three-story administrative building at DAR Headquarters that would connect DAR Constitution Hall and Memorial Continental Hall.

In 1948, she urged the United States Congress to act swiftly regarding the Universal Military Training and Service Act in order to deal with what she called the "Communist Crisis". That same year, she spoke at the 75th anniversary of the Chautauqua Institution in Chautauqua, New York, advocating for American schools and colleges to promote the American democratic "way of life" to combat Communism in public life. She also argued that Communists should not be allowed to have public jobs. She went on to praise the Boy Scouts of America and the Girl Scouts of the USA for promoting better citizenship for American youth.

Also an anti-globalist, she spoke out against the idea of a World Government plan, as she believed that would mean sacrificing American rights and sovereignty, and said that the DAR would oppose such a plan "until it is killed."

In 1949, she was the special guest at the Virginia DAR's 53rd state conference.

== Personal life ==
She married Roscoe C. O'Byrne, a lawyer whom she met at college. They lived in Brookville, Indiana.

== Death and legacy ==
She died in May 1987 in Indiana. The O'Byrne Gallery at Memorial Continental Hall was dedicated in her honor.
