= Estelle Anna Lewis =

American poet

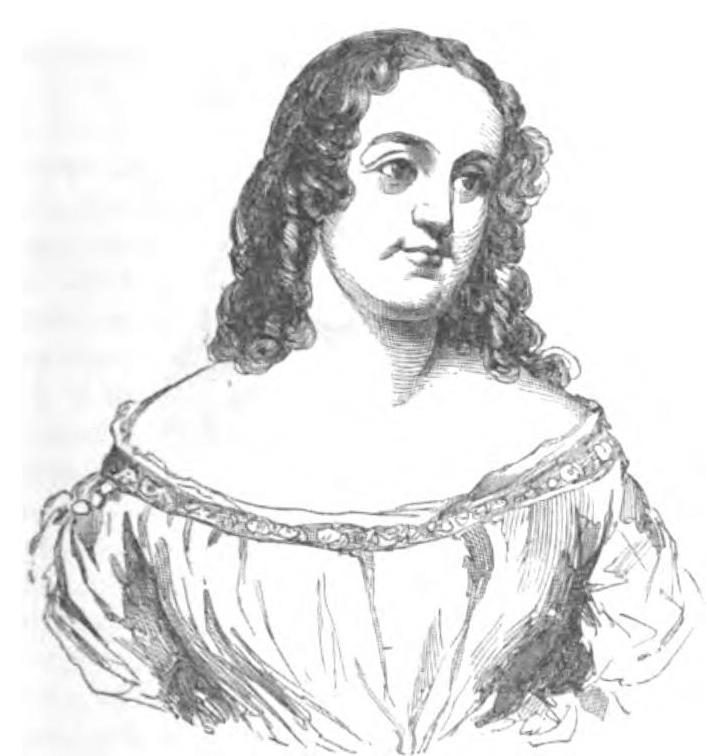
- Died: November 24, 1880
- Occupation: Writer

Estelle Anna Lewis (née Sarah Anna Robinson; April 1824 – November 24, 1880) was a 19th-century American poet and dramatist. After marriage, she started using pen names, including "Estelle", "Stella", and "Stells".

She published several volumes of verse. The first volume of poems, chiefly lyric, The records of the Heart, was published by the Appletons in 1844, followed by The Child of the Sea and Other Poems (N. Y. George P. Putnam, 1848), and the Myths of the Minstrel (Appletons, 1852). In 1854, Lewis published in Graham's Magazine a series of critical and biographical essays, entitled “Art and Artists in America." While in Italy, in 1863, she wrote her first tragedy, Helemah; or, The Fall of Montezuma, which she published in New York, during a protracted visit to the United States. The success of this work encouraged her to write Sappho of Lesbos, a tragedy (London, 1868) which reached a seventh edition, was translated into modern Greek and played in Athens. A third tragedy of hers was The King's Stratagem; or, The Pearl of Poland (Trubner & Co., London, 1873). After her return to England, in 1865, an illustrated edition of her Poetical works, which had been published in the U.S. in 1858, was reprinted by H. G. Bohn, London, 1866. Under the name of “Stella" she contributed to U.S. journals piquant letters on travel, literature, and art. Her last work was a series of sonnets in defense of Edgar Allan Poe.

== Biography ==
Sarah Anna Robinson was born near Baltimore, Maryland, April 1824. She was the daughter of John Robinson, a wealthy planter from Cuba of English and Spanish descent.

She began writing very early, her first efforts, a series of stories, appearing during her school days in the Family Magazine of Albany, New York. While a school girl at the Emma Willard School in Troy, New York, she translated the Aeneid into English verse, composed a ballad called "The Forsaken," which Poe praised extravagantly, and published Records of the Heart, which contains some of her best minor verses (New York, 1844).

Lewis continued to contribute frequently to periodicals. She was a great linguist, well versed in the ancient and modern languages, and also proficient in the sciences.

In 1841, she married Sidney D. Lewis, an attorney and counsellor of Brooklyn, New York, and she moved to his home. They hosted salons and were noted figures in the New York literary scene. They were divorced in 1858, and afterwards, she resided mostly abroad, principally in England.

While in Italy, in 1863, she wrote her tragedy of Helémah, or the Fall of Montezuma, which was published on her return to the United States the next year (New York, 1864). The success of this work encouraged her to write Sappho of Lesbos, a tragedy, her best dramatic work (London, 1868). This reached a seventh edition, and was translated into modern Greek and played at Athens. Other works included The Child of the Sea and other Poems (New York, 1848), The Myths of the Minstrel (1852), Poems (London, 1866) and The King's Stratagem, a tragedy (1869).

Lewis' later years were passed in England, returning there in 1865. Her last work was a series of sonnets in defence of Poe. The French poet Alphonse de Lamartine called her the "Female Petrarch," and Poe "the rival of Sappho." Adrien Rouquette translated Lewis' poems into French.

She died at Bedord Place, London, W.C. November 24, 1880.

== Critical response ==
Her writings were characterized as commonplace in character.

Lamartine referred to her as a "female Petrarch.” Yet, within ten years after her death, she had been so completely forgotten that she was not deemed worthy a place in Stedman and Hutchinson's exhaustive Library of American Literature.

== Selected works ==
- Records of the Heart : Lyrical and Narrative Poems (New York, 1844)
- The Forsaken
- The Child of the Sea and other Poems (New York, 1848)
- The Myths of the Minstrel (New York, 1852)
- Records of the Heart. Complete poetical works. Illustrations. (New York, 1857)
- Helémah, or the Fall of Montezuma: a Tragedy (New York, 1863)
- Sappho of Lesbos: a Tragedy (London, 1868)
- The King's Stratagem; or, the Pearl of Poland : a Tragedy. (London, 1869)

== Sources ==
- "ESTELLE ANNA LEWIS (1824 – 1880)". librarycompany.org.
