= USS Estelle =

Patrol vessel of the United States Navy

History

United States
- Name: USS Estelle (1917–1918); USS SP-747 (1918–1933)
- Acquired: 1917
- Renamed: SP-747 in 1918
- Fate: Stricken 1933
- Notes: On loan to Culver Naval School 1919–1933

General characteristics
- Type: Patrol vessel

USS Estelle (SP-747), later USS SP-747, was a United States Navy patrol vessel commissioned in 1917 and stricken in 1933.

Estelle was built as a private motorboat of the same name. The U.S. Navy acquired her in 1917 for use as a section patrol vessel in World War I. She apparently was commissioned that year as USS Estelle (SP-747).

Little information is available regarding Estelle's naval career. Apparently she saw service as a section patrol boat somewhere along the coast of the United States for the rest of World War I. She was renamed USS SP-747 sometime in 1918.

On 23 June 1919, a dispatch directed the Commandant, 3rd Naval District, to ship SP-747 and the patrol boat USS Ahdeek (SP-2589) to the Culver Naval School in Culver, Indiana. Like Ahdeek, she presumably operated there on loan from the Navy for many years, because she was not stricken from the Navy Directory until sometime in 1933, the same year Ahdeek was stricken.
