= Estelle Sapir =

Polish Jewish Holocaust survivor

Estelle Sapir (25 January 1923 – 13 April 1999) was a Polish Jewish Holocaust survivor who achieved a measure of fame for her successful battle with the Swiss banking industry, in particular Credit Suisse, after a half-century of fighting for the return of her family's money, which had been deposited by her father, Józef Sapir, before he was murdered in the Nazi concentration camp at Majdanek during World War II.

In 1998, Credit Suisse – which had demanded her father's death certificate, which did not exist due to the circumstances of his murder in a concentration camp, in order to release the funds – and Estelle Sapir jointly announced that the case was settled. The amount was not disclosed due to a confidentiality agreement but has been estimated at $500,000 USD.

Sapir died on 13 April 1999, aged 76, in Rockaway Park, Queens, New York from a heart attack after a period of poor health. She never married and was survived by two nieces and a nephew. She had maintained her Polish citizenship until her death and was a permanent resident alien in the United States, not a naturalized U.S. citizen, unlike her fellow co-plaintiffs.
