= Yevgeni Golovchenko =

Russian footballer

Personal information
- Full name: Yevgeni Vladimirovich Golovchenko
- Date of birth: 14 July 1973 (age 53)
- Height: 1.85 m (6 ft 1 in)
- Position: Goalkeeper

Senior career*
Years	Team	Apps	(Gls)
1992–1998	FC Okean Nakhodka	34	(0)
1993	→ FC Okean-d Nakhodka (loan)	18	(0)
2001	FC Okean Nakhodka	4	(0)
2002	FC Portovik-Energiya Kholmsk (amateur)		
- * Club domestic league appearances and goals

Yevgeni Vladimirovich Golovchenko (Russian: Евгений Владимирович Головченко; born 14 July 1973) is a former Russian football player.
