= Estelle Bajou =

American producer, musician and writer

Estelle Bajou is an American composer, musician, producer, and writer.

== Biography ==
Raised in the mountains of North Carolina, Bajou is a bilingual French-American, and has traveled throughout America, Europe, Latin America, Iraq and the Middle East for her work. At 19 years old, Bajou got her Bachelors magna cum laude in Theatre & Creative Writing from the Bard College at Simon's Rock. She also has an MFA in Acting: The New School for Drama.

Some of her acting assignments include: Steven Spielberg's The Post (2017), Gino Dilorio's The Jag (2017), Chaplin of the Mountains (2013). She was an Understudy in Once on the First National Broadway Tour. She composed and performed the original music for 'Please Excuse My Dear Aunt Sally' (2015). She wrote the music for 'Women Rising' which was a show that, in 2017, was used as a fundraiser for Domestic Violence Awareness Month.

She was described by Neil Genzlinger of The New York Times as "simply astonishing." In 2016, she was nominated for a Drama Desk Award for Outstanding Music in a Play.
