= Estelle (surname) =

Estelle is a surname. Notable people with the surname include:

- Dick Estelle (born 1942), American former baseball pitcher
- Don Estelle (1933–2003), British actor
- Jean-Baptiste Estelle (1662–1723), French consul in the Moroccan city of Salé and mayor of Marseille
- Julie Estelle (born 1989), Indonesian actress and model
- Mark Estelle (born 1981), American former football player
