= Estelle Turrell Smith =

American social reformer

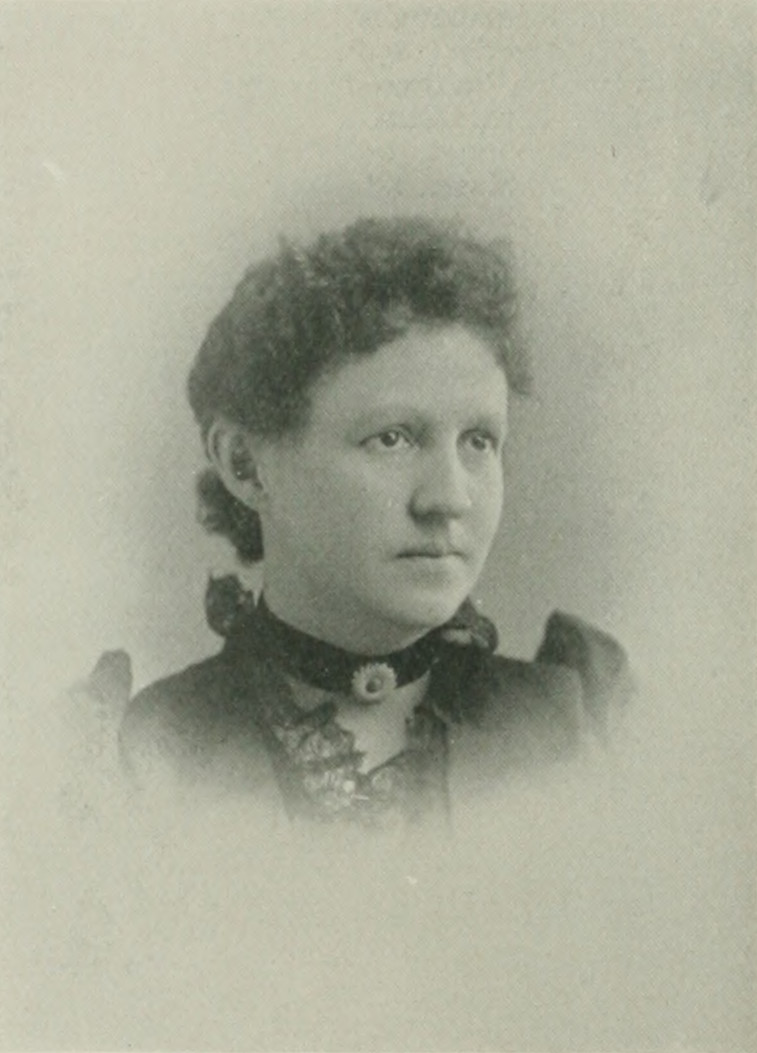
Estelle Turrell Smith, A woman of the century

Estelle Turrell Smith (born October 30, 1854) was an American social reformer.

== Early life ==
Estelle Turrell Smith was born in Forest Lake Township, Susquehanna County, Pennsylvania, on October 30, 1854. Her father's people were among the first settlers of Pennsylvania, emigrating at an early day from Connecticut. Her mother's family were Quakers. Her mother's maiden name was Gurney, and she was a descendant of Joseph John Gurney and Elizabeth Fry.

In childhood Smith was thought old for her years, was fond of poetry and music, and delighted in the studies of natural science. She became early acquainted with the fauna and flora about her country home. Her studies commenced at home and were pursued in the Montrose Academy, Montrose, Pennsylvania.

== Career ==
She started to teach when seventeen years of age, at the same time continuing her special studies, then among the masters of art and song. In 1875 she moved with her parents to Longmont, Colorado. She taught two years in the State Agricultural College in Fort Collins, Colorado.

After the death of her husband, she became more deeply interested in the problems of woman's progress. Having means and leisure at her command, she devoted much time to the study and support of social reforms. Her devotion to the work of reform and her frequent contributions to the press soon won for her a place as a leader.

Soon after her second marriage, she was elected president of the Polk County Woman Suffrage Society. She was an efficient member of the State executive committee for four years, and president of the State Woman Suffrage Association of Iowa. At her instigation a series of mothers' mass meetings was held in Des Moines. The large City Hall was filled again and again, hundreds of women taking active part. Smith was chosen president of the meetings. Through those meetings a bill regulating the property rights of women was presented to the State legislature. In November 1896, she addressed the twenty-fifth annual convention of the association.

== Personal life ==
In 1875 she became the wife of P. M. Hinman, secretary of the State Board of Agriculture, who died a few years later.

In 1884 she became the wife of Dr. A. B. Smith, of Des Moines, Iowa.
