= Estelle Lazer =

Australian archaeologist

Dr. Estelle Lazer is an independent archaeologist who has worked on sites in the Middle East, Italy, Cyprus, the UK, Antarctica and Australia. She teaches at the University of Sydney and the University of NSW. Her PhD thesis was based on the human skeletal remains discovered at Pompeii, where she spent over 7 field seasons.

== Pompeii skeletons ==
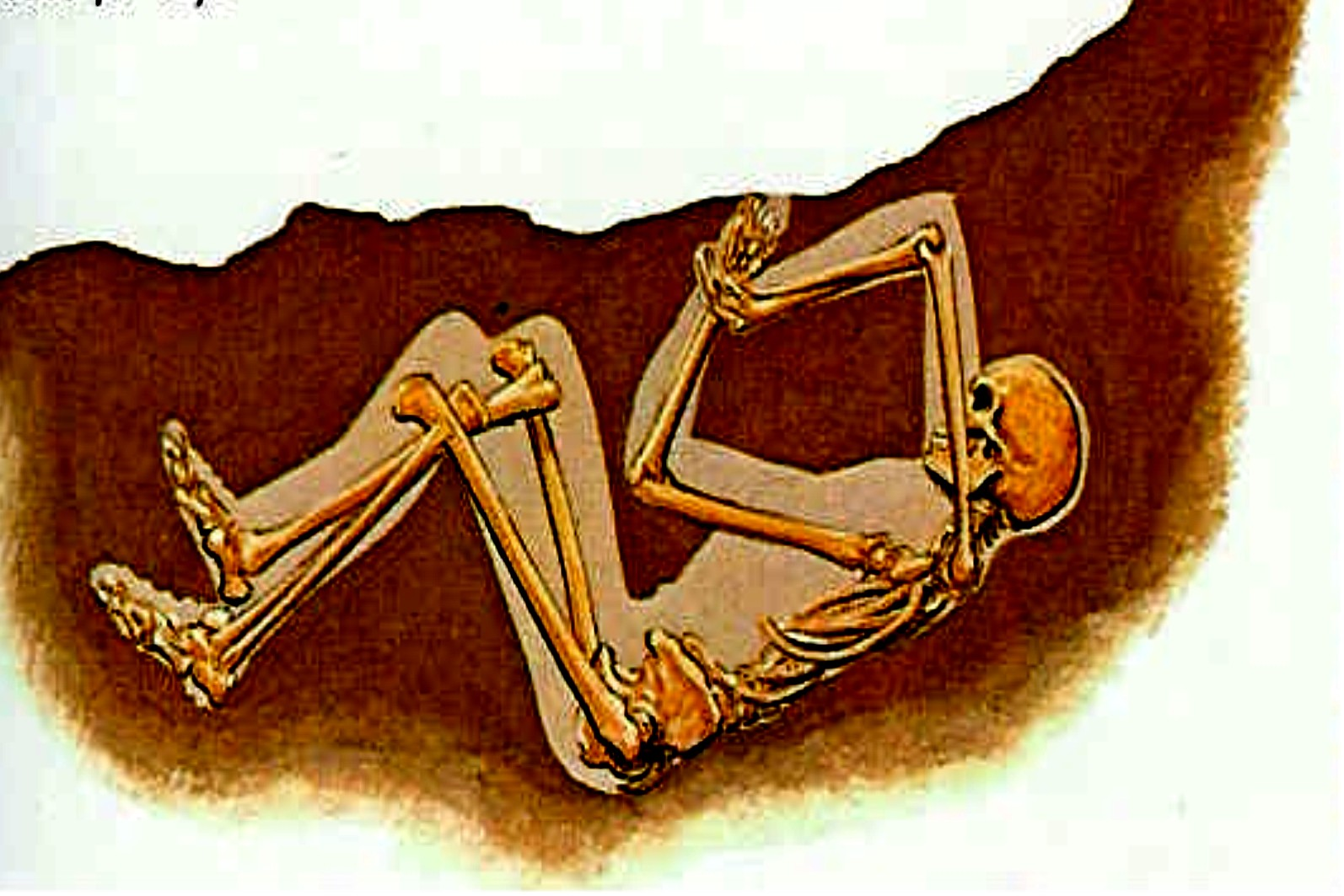
For her doctoral thesis, Estelle Lazer studied the skeletons contained within plaster casts at Pompeii

Estelle Lazer, Australian archaeologist and physical anthropologist from Sydney University, has studied the human remains from Pompeii and has reached some interesting conclusions. From her study of their bones, Lazer has challenged the conventional interpretation that the people who were left behind to die in Pompeii were the very old, the very young, women and those too sick or weak to escape. She believes that the victims were a good representative sample of the population, a balance of male and female, young and old. There may have been more children among the victims than the skeletons suggest, because not all children's bones would have survived. The bones show that the people of Pompeii were well-nourished and healthy and similar in size to the people who live in Naples today, 154 cm for females and 167 cm for male. About 10 percent of the skeletons show signs of arthritis, some having a form of arthritis usually associated with old age.

Many of the skulls examined by Lazer have teeth which show considerable wear compared to teeth today. Some are worn down to the gumline, exposing the nerve, which must have been a very painful condition. The wearing down of teeth was probably caused by traces of grit and stone in the bread which came from the millstone used to grind the wheat into flour. Some teeth have cavities and others have a heavy build-up of plaque which would have caused bad breath. There are signs of gum disease and abscesses related to decayed teeth. There is no sign of dental intervention such as extractions, fillings, crowns, or false teeth.

A body cast was brought to Australia in 1994 as part of the Australian Museum's exhibition on Pompeii. With the Archaeological Superintendent of Pompeii's permission, the body was x-rayed in a Sydney clinic. The results, and the cast itself, were analysed by Estelle Lazer and the team of medical specialists. It was the first high-tech examination of a Pompeian. The study concluded that the Lady of Oplontis was aged between 30 and 40, and was in good health apart from dental work. She was 1.5 metres tall, wore clothes and a gold bracelet, and was clutching a money purse when she died. The cast shows the 'pugilist pose' characteristic of bodies exposed to extreme temperature at the time of death.

Lazer concluded from her studies of the skeletal remains that there were three main causes of death at Pompeii:

- asphyxiation, which she concludes was a major cause of death.
- thermal shock, which is evident in the pugilistic poses of the bodies, caused by sudden contraction of the muscles.
- concussion, from falling bits of debris and collapsing houses, as the eruption was accompanied by a series of earth tremors.

== Publications ==
Title	Publisher	Publication Date	Notes
Pompeii and Herculaneum: Interpreting the Evidence	Ancient History Seminars	2005	written in conjunction with Dr Brian Brennan
Resurrecting Pompeii	Routledge	2006	
