= Gertrude Sprague Carraway =

American educator and journalist

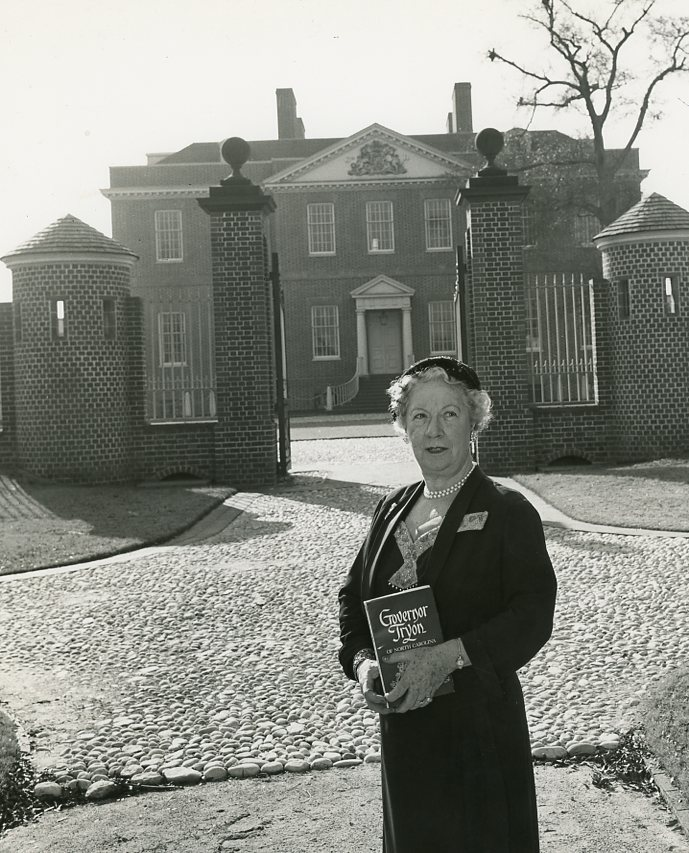
- Carraway in front of Tryon Palace

22nd DAR President General, National Society Daughters of the American Revolution
- In office 1953–1956
- Preceded by: Marguerite Courtright Patton
- Succeeded by: Allene Wilson Groves

Personal details
- Born: August 6, 1896 New Bern, North Carolina, U.S.
- Died: May 7, 1993 (aged 96)
- Education: State Normal and Industrial College; Columbia University

Gertrude Sprague Carraway (August 6, 1896 – May 7, 1993) was an American educator, journalist who wrote for The New York Times and the Associated Press, served as the 22nd President General of the Daughters of the American Revolution, and preservationist who led restoration efforts of Tryon Palace.

== Early life and journalism career ==
Carraway was born in New Bern, North Carolina, the daughter of John Robert Bennett Carraway and Louise Elgie. She was a member of Christ Episcopal Church in New Bern and wrote a book on their history, Crown of Life.

After graduating New Bern High School as valedictorian in 1912 at 15, she studied at the State Normal and Industrial College (now UNC-Greensboro) and began a career as a teacher of History, French, and English. Recognized for her abilities, she was offered a position as editor of The Smithfield Observer. From there, her interest in professional journalism grew and she enrolled in journalism graduate studies Columbia University. She began to write for her hometown paper,The New Bernian, and would continue to write for them until 1937. Throughout the 1920s and 1930s, Carraway wrote for an increasing number of publications, including the Sun-Journal, Raleigh Times, The New York Times, Associated Press, and Christian Science Monitor, under the name G. S. Carraway. She wrote on both local and international topics.

== DAR membership ==
Carraway's articles on local history gained the attention of Edwin C Gregory, whose wife, Mary Margret Gregory, was DAR North Carolina State Regent (1925–1928). Once they realized Carraway was a woman, Mary encouraged her to join the DAR. Carraway immediately became the State Publicity Committee Chairman. She later served as State Regent (1946–1949), Vice President General (1949– 1952), editor of the DAR Magazine (1950–1953)

=== President General administration ===
Carraway ran unopposed for DAR President General in 1953 and her theme was "economy, efficiency and expansion." She was the first North Carolinian and the first single woman elected as President General.

Carraway was responsible for persuading the Eisenhower administration to officially establish Constitution Week as a nationally recognized observance. President Dwight D. Eisenhower issued an official proclamation on 26 Jul 1955 to annually recognize Constitution Week was September 17-23. United States residents were encouraged to "observe that week with appropriate ceremonies in their schools and churches... give thanks for the wisdom of those statesmen of 1787... who contributed to making our Constitution a living thing, a great taproot to feed and support the growth of our republic." Other highlights of the Carraway administration include the elimination of debt, the establishment of the Investment Trust Fund (for which she raised $59,848.05).

== Historic preservation ==
A lifelong historian, Carraway helped found the Historic Preservation Society of North Carolina. In 1939, she discovered sets of John Hawks's plans for the original Tryon Palace, which greatly assisted with the restoration. She served as secretary of the Tryon Palace Commission from 1945 to 1956, then Restoration Director from 1956 to 1971. The restoration efforts conducted by the Tryon Palace Commission were part of the Colonial Revival preservation movement, and have since been criticized for "instead focusing on the beauty of colonial decorative arts and architecture and patriotic sentiments instead of historical accuracy," ignoring "Governor Tryon's controversial administration, African-Americans, and lower classes."

She served on the executive board of the State Department of Archives and History from 1942 until her death in 1993 and helped create the North Carolina Historical Marker Program.

== Awards and recognition ==
- 1948 Cannon Award, First Recipient, Historic Preservation Society of North Carolina
- 1958 "Woman of the Year," New Bern, NC
- Awarded the degree of Doctor of Humane Letters by her alma mater, UNC-Greensboro
- 1962 North Carolinian of the Year from Our State
- 1971 Crittendon Memorial Award from North Carolina Literary & Historical Association
- 1985 North Caroliniana Award
- Gertrude S. Carraway Research Library at The Archives at the North Carolina History Center
- Carraway Garden at Tryon Palace
- Gertrude S. Carraway Awards of Merit presented to "individuals or organizations that have demonstrated a genuine commitment to historic preservation."
