= Estela Golovchenko =

Uruguayan playwright (born 1963)

Estela Golovchenko (born 16 March 1963) is a Uruguayan playwright, actress, and theater director.

== Biography ==
Estela Golovchenko was born in San Javier, in the Río Negro Department of Uruguay. In 1986, she moved to Fray Bentos (and has since lived there) and joined the theatrical group Teatro sin Fogón. She conducted courses and acting workshops Sergio Lazzo and Enrique Permuy, directing workshops with Rubén Yáñez and Jorge Curi, staging workshops with Rubén Szuchmacher, and theatrical animation courses with Antonio Baldomir and Enrique Laiño, among others.

Thanks to a grant from the Uruguayan Center of the UNESCO International Theater Institute for the first national theater workshop in Uruguay in 1991, and she received classes from Richard Ferraro, Levón and Héctor Manuel Vidal. Another scholarship in 1994, from the Comedia Nacional, allowed her to work as an assistant director for Jorge Curi. In 2004, she graduated from the workshop for the teaching of scenic art of the Ministry of Education and Culture (Uruguay), studying under such names as Carlos Aguilera, Graciela Escuder, Myriam Gleijer, Roberto Jones, Isabel Pérez, Mary Vázquez and Elena Zuasti.
