= Stella (given name) =

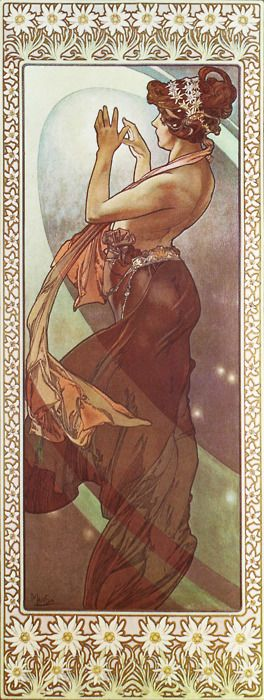
- L'Étoile Polaire, part of a 1902 Art Nouveau decorative panel by Alfons Mucha.
- Pronunciation: /ˈstɛlə/ STEL-ə
- Gender: Female

Origin
- Meaning: star in Latin; pillar in Greek.

Other names
- Related names: Stelios, Stylianos, Estelle, Estella

Stella is a female given name. It is derived from the Latin word for star. It has been in use in English-speaking countries since it was first used by Philip Sidney in Astrophel and Stella, his 1580s sonnet sequence. Use might also have increased due to Stella Maris as a title for the Virgin Mary by Catholics. Alternately, it is a feminine version of the Greek name Stylianos, meaning pillar.

== Popularity ==
Stella has been well-used in countries where Germanic and Romance languages are spoken: England and Italy themselves, and especially Anglophone Africa and Latin America.

== List of people with the given name Stella ==
=== Arts and entertainment ===
- Stella, stage name of Stella Huang, Singaporean singer-actress
- Stella Abrera (born 1978), Filipino-American ballet dancer
- Stella Adler (1901–1992), American actress and acting teacher
- Stella Arbenina (1884–1976), Russian-born actress
- Stella Bennett or Benee (born 2000), New Zealand singer-songwriter
- Stella Benson (1892–1933), English feminist, travel writer, and novelist
- Stella Blandy (1836–1925), French woman of letters, feminist
- Stella Bowen (1893–1947), Australian artist
- Stella Brennan (born 1974), New Zealand artist, curator, and essayist
- Stella Chitty (1928–2005), British stage manager
- Stella Chiweshe (1946–2023), Zimbabwean musician
- Stella Corkery (born 1960), New Zealand artist and musician
- Stella Dadzie (born 1952), British writer, historian, educationalist and activist
- Stella Feehily (born 1969), London-born Irish playwright and actress
- Stella Miles Franklin (1879–1954), Australian novelist
- Stella Jones (singer) (born 1971), German soul and jazz singer, pianist, arranger and composer
- Stella Keitel, American actress
- Stella Kon (born 1944), Singaporean playwright
- Stella Weiner Kriegshaber (1879–1966), American pianist
- Stella Lefty (born 2002), American singer-songwriter
- Stella LeSaint (1881–1948), American silent film actress
- Stella Linden (1919–2005), actress and writer
- Stella Madden, English actress
- Stella Maessen (born 1953), Dutch singer
- Stella Maeve (born 1989), American actress
- Stella Malucchi (born 1977), Thai model and actress
- Stella Maxwell (born 1990), Northern Irish model
- Stella Meghie, Canadian film director and screenwriter
- Stella De Mette (1891–1989), American contralto opera singer
- Stella Moray (1923–2006), English actress
- Stella Mwangi (born 1986), Norwegian-Kenyan singer
- Stella Parton (born 1949), American country music singer/songwriter, sister of Dolly Parton
- Stella Pevsner (1921–2020), author of children's books
- Stella Reid (born 1964), co-star of the Fox network reality television show Nanny 911
- Stella Richman (1922–2002), British television producer
- Stella Roman (1904–1992), Romanian operatic soprano
- Stella Seah (born 1992), Singaporean singer-songwriter
- Stella Soleil (born 1971), American pop and rock singer
- Stella Stevens (1934–2023), American model and actress born Estelle Eggleston
- Stella Steyn (1907–1987), Irish artist
- Stella Stocker (1858–1925), American composer and choral conductor
- Stella Stratigou (1931–2005), Greek actress
- Stella Vander (born 1950), French singer and musician
- Stella Vine (born 1969), English artist
- Stella (born Kim Da-hyun, 2007), South Korean singer, member of the girl group Hearts2Hearts

=== Sports ===
- Stella Ashcroft (born 2002), gymnast from New Zealand
- Stella Barsosio (born 1993), Kenyan long-distance runner
- Stella Boumi (born 1988), Greek swimmer
- Stella Heiß (born 1993), German curler
- Stella de Heij (born 1968), Dutch field hockey goalkeeper
- Stela Posavec (born 1996), Croatian handball player
- Stella Pilatou (born 1980), Greek long jumper
- Stella Rutto (born 1996), Romanian steeplechaser
- Stella Tsikouna (born 1972), Greek discus thrower
- Stella Zakharova (born 1963), Olympic gymnast for the former Soviet Union

=== Politics ===
- Stella Ambler (born 1966), Canadian politician
- Stella Creasy (born 1977), British Member of Parliament
- Stella Dupont (born 1973), French Member of Parliament
- Stella Garza-Hicks (born 1953), former Republican legislator in the U.S. state of Colorado
- Stella Goldschlag (1922–1994), German Jewish woman who collaborated with the Gestapo during World War II
- Stella Gherman (born 1974), Moldovan Member of Parliament
- Stella Isaacs, Marchioness of Reading (1894–1971), British political and military figure
- Stella Jantuan (born 1966), Moldovan politician
- Stella Levy (1924–1999), Israeli soldier and politician
- Stella Oduah-Ogiemwonyi (born 1962), Nigerian Minister of Aviation
- Stella Maris Olalla (born 1943), Argentine politician
- Stella Omu (born 1946), Nigerian politician
- Stella Sigcau (1937–2006), Minister in the South African government and first female prime minister of the Transkei

=== Other ===
- Stella Baruk (born 1932), Iranian-born French teacher, mathematician, author and educationalist
- Stella Burry (1897–1991), Canadian activist
- Stella Cunliffe (1917–2012), British statistician
- Stella Din-Jacob, Nigerian media executive, broadcast journalist, lawyer and Director of News at TVC Communications
- Stella Immanuel (born 1965), Cameroonian-American physician, author, and pastor
- Stella Koutros, American cancer epidemiologist
- Stella Liebeck, American plaintiff in the "McDonald's coffee case"
- Stella Manzie (born 1960), British public servant and civil servant
- Stella Márquez (born 1937), Colombian beauty queen and first Miss International
- Stella Mary Newton (1901–2001), English fashion designer and dress historian
- Stella Mason (c.1901?–1918), Muscogee/Creek freedman, subject to a known lawsuit over an estate
- Stella Maxwell (born 1990), Northern Irish fashion model
- Stella McCartney (born 1971), British fashion designer
- Stella Nickell (born 1943), American murderer
- Stella Nyanzi (born 1974), Ugandan human rights activist
- Stella Obasanjo (1945–2005), former First Lady of Nigeria
- Stella Rimington (1935–2025), British author and Director General of MI5 (1992–1996)
- Stella Ross-Craig (1906–2006), British botanic illustrator
- Stella de Silva (1918–2012), paediatrician from Sri Lanka
- Stella Hackel Sims (born 1926), Director of the United States Mint from 1977 to 1981
- Stella Tennant (1970–2020), Scottish model
- Stella Tillyard (born 1957), British author and historian
- Stella Young (1982–2014), Australian comedian, journalist and disability rights activist
- Stella P M S R Godoy (born 1990), a Brazilian scientist

=== Fictional characters ===
- Stella (Winx Club), one of the main characters of Winx Club
- Stella, a main character in ToddWorld
- Stella, a main character in Stella and Sam
- Stella a female snow goose who is Boris' girlfriend and appears in Balto III: Wings of Change
- Stella, female protagonist of an anime movie Interstella 5555: The 5tory of the 5ecret 5tar 5ystem
- Stella of the Ars Goetia, a character in the animated series Helluva Boss, voiced by Georgina Leahy
- Stella Bains, a character from the movie Back to the Future
- Stella Bonasera, character in CSI: NY
- Stella Bonnaro, character in Cowboy Bebop
- Stella Chernak, character in the TV drama Peyton Place
- Stella the Storyteller, fictional character from the TV series Barney & Friends
- Stella Crawford, character in the BBC soap opera EastEnders
- Stella Dagostino, character in Rush
- Stella Grayber, a character in Poppy Playtime
- Stella Kidd, character in the TV drama “Chicago Fire”
- Stella Kowalski, character in the play A Streetcar Named Desire
- Stella Loussier, character in the anime Gundam SEED Destiny
- Stella Malone, character in the Disney Channel series Jonas
- Stella Mann (television character), character in the German soap opera Verbotene Liebe (Forbidden Love)
- Stella Maynard, character in Anne of the Island
- Stella Maynard, supporting character from Devil's Third
- Stella Moon, character in the Scottish BBC drama TV series Monarch of the Glen
- Stella Morris, title character of Sky One series Stella
- Stella Mudd, wife of Harcourt Fenton "Harry" Mudd. from Star Trek "I, Mudd"
- Stella Price, character in the British soap opera Coronation Street
- Stella Nicholls, protagonist of Scary Stories to Tell in the Dark
- Stella Shortman, a character from Nickelodeon's Hey Arnold!
- Stella Takachiho, a character in the Revue Starlight franchise
- Stella Urquhart, character in the 1983 film Local Hero
- Stella Vermillion, a mage knight from Chivalry of a Failed Knight
- Stella Zhau, from the American animated series The Loud House
- Stella, the ideal woman in the work of Norwegian poet Henrik Wergeland
- Stella is the name of the Glinda analogue in The Wizard of the Emerald City series by Alexander Volkov
- Stella, a female Galah in the Angry Birds series including the spin-off Angry Birds Stella
- Stella Klauser, a non-playable character in Final Fantasy V
- Queen Stella, a non-playable character in Final Fantasy IX
- Stella, a non-playable character in Final Fantasy Fables: Chocobo's Dungeon
- Stella, a supporting character in Totally Spies! in which she is the mother of super spy Clover
- Stella, a character in the 2006 film Over the Hedge
- Stella, one of the main characters in the series Trulli Tales
- Stella, the guardian of the Sparkle Theater in Princess Peach: Showtime!
- Stella the Star Fairy, a character from the Rainbow Magic book franchise
- Stella, the main protagonist of the video game Spiritfarer

== Name day ==
- Hungary : 14 July
- Latvia : 25 December
- Bulgaria : 26 November
- Czech Republic : 4 March
- Italy : 11 May
- Sweden : 15 August
- France : 11 May

== See also ==
- Estelle (given name)
- Esther (given name)
- Stella (disambiguation)
