= Stelian =

Stelian is a masculine Romanian given name. Its diminutive is Stelică . It may also be used as a surname. Notable people with the name include:

== Given name ==
- Stelian Anghel, Romanian footballer
- Stelian Badea, Romanian footballer
- Stelian Baltă, Romanian businessman
- Stelian Bordeianu, Romanian footballer
- Stelian Burcea
- Stelian Cucu, Romanian footballer
- Stelian Diaconescu, better known under the pen name Ion Caraion (1923–1986), Romanian poet and literary critic
- Stelian Ion (born 1977), Romanian politician
- Stelian Isac, Romanian footballer
- Giani Stelian Kiriță or Giani Kiriță (born 1977), Romanian footballer
- Stelian Marin, Romanian footballer
- Stelian Moculescu
- Dănuț Stelian Oprea or Dănuț Oprea, Romanian footballer
- Stelian Popescu
- Stelian Stancu
- Stelian Tănase
- Stelian Trasborg, Bulgarian footballer

== Surname ==
- Stelian Baltă, Romanian businessman

== See also ==
- Stiliyan/Stilyan/Stilian
