= Mihai Ștețca =

Romanian footballer

Personal information
- Full name: Mihai Doru Ștețca
- Date of birth: 7 March 1981 (age 45)
- Place of birth: Negrești-Oaș, Romania
- Height: 1.87 m (6 ft 2 in)
- Position: Goalkeeper

Team information
- Current team: CFR Cluj (GK Coach)

Youth career
- Oaşul Negrești

Senior career*
Years	Team	Apps	(Gls)
2001–2003	FC Baia Mare		
2003–2005	Oaşul Negrești	17	(0)
2005–2009	Gaz Metan Mediaș	86	(0)
2009–2011	FCM Târgu Mureș	31	(0)
2011–2013	Turnu Severin	33	(0)
2013	FCMU Baia Mare	11	(0)
Total		178	(0)

Managerial career
- 2014–2015: Sighetu Marmaţiei (GK Coach)
- 2015–2016: FCM Baia Mare (GK Coach)
- 2016–2017: Olimpia Satu Mare (GK Coach)
- 2017–2018: ASU Politehnica Timișoara (GK Coach)
- 2018–2019: Botoșani (GK Coach)
- 2019–2020: Petrolul Ploiești (GK Coach)
- 2020–2021: Universitatea Cluj (GK Coach)
- 2021–2023: Voluntari (GK Coach)
- 2023–2024: CFR Cluj (GK Coach)
- 2024–: CFR Cluj (GK Coach)
- * Club domestic league appearances and goals

Mihai Doru Ștețca (born 7 March 1981) is a Romanian former professional footballer who played as a goalkeeper, currently goalkeeping coach at Liga I club CFR Cluj.

== Honours ==
FCM Târgu Mureș

- Liga II: 2009–2010
