= Stiliyan =

Stiliyan, Stilyan, or Stilian (Bulgarian: Стилиян) is a Bulgarian masculine given name. The there are corresponding feminine given names, with ending '-a' (Bulgarian: Стилияна). It is derived from Greek Στυλιανός (Stylianos). Notable people with the name include:

== Masculine name ==
- Stilian Chilingirov, Bulgarian writer
- Stilyan Grozdev (born 1999), Bulgarian weightlifter
- Stilian Kirov, Orchestra conductor
- Stiliyan Kovachev (1860–1939), Bulgarian general
- Stiliyan Makarski (born 1985), Bulgarian badminton player
- Stilyan Nikolov (born 1991), Bulgarian footballer
- Stiliyan Petrov (born 1979), Bulgarian footballer
- Stiliyan Tisovski (born 2003), Bulgarian footballer

== Feminine name ==
- Stiliana Nikolova (born 2005), Bulgarian rhythmic gymnast

== See also ==
- Stelian
- Stilian
