= Didactic Contract =

Concept introduced by Frenchman Guy Brousseau in the 1980s

In didactics, the didactic contract is a concept introduced by Guy Brousseau, a French mathematics didactician. He defines it as "the set of teacher behaviors expected by the learner, and the set of learner behaviors expected by the teacher".

This didactic contract describes the implicit or explicit rules that frame the sharing of responsibilities between the teacher and the learner in relation to the knowledge mobilized or structured. It is therefore a representation of what both parties expect from each other.

== Description ==
=== Definition ===
The didactic contract implies an implicit determination, which is neither written nor clearly stated, of the respective roles of the student and the teacher, in the classroom and in relation to knowledge. About the didactic contract, Brousseau states that it is "a relationship that determines, explicitly for a small part, but above all implicitly, what each partner (teacher and the student) is responsible for managing and what they will take care of in one way or another. This system of reciprocal obligation resembles a contract."

The didactic contract is linked to the pedagogical contract, which is focused on the social dimension of the teacher-student relationship.

=== Paradox ===
This concept is also linked to the concept of devolution of the problem since it confronts the teacher with a paradox: what they undertake to make the student produce the behaviors they expect, knowing that they deprive the latter of the conditions necessary for the understanding and learning of the targeted notion. This notion highlights a concept: the teacher carries out the "devolution of a problem" and not the communication of knowledge.

=== Principal ideas ===
The three principal ideas about this concept are:

- The idea of shared responsibility (the teacher owes things to the student, and the student owes things to the teacher: there is a teacher's job and a student's job).
- The consideration of the implicit (everything is implicit, they are unspoken).
- The relationship to knowledge (Brousseau states it is a communicative situation: the teacher is the sender, the students are the receivers, and the message is knowledge).

The didactic contract is indispensable and has four main functions:

- Create a space for dialogue.
- Take into consideration the class's customs.
- Manage rules and decisions.
- Put in interaction.

=== Interests ===
The didactic contract is necessary for the students and the teacher to overcome the paradox of the didactic relationship. The teacher does not have the right to tell the child what they want and yet they must make the child produce the expected response.

The didactic contract is also of some help to the teacher because it allows them to interpret the students' responses and recognize them as a sign of learning.

=== Beginning of the didactic contract ===
The didactic contract begins at the start of kindergarten. Laurence Garcion-Vautor highlights the importance of rituals carried out every morning in kindergarten classes. This allows the constitution of a stable and constantly evolving environment that favors entry into the didactic contract.

== Breaching of the didactic contract ==
The didactic contract is clearer when it is breached by one of the partners. Any teaching of a new concept causes breaks in the contract in relation to concepts learned previously and therefore requires a renegotiation. For example, the teaching of geometry begins with the creation of drawings using geometric instruments (compasses, rulers, etc.) and then evolves, with the student having to use abstract objects represented by geometric properties.

This change of didactic contract is a source of difficulty and even failure for many students, but it is necessary for learning. For the student, a didactic contract is a form of didactic obstacle.

== Unintended consequences ==
=== The example of L’Âge du capitaine ===
In L'Âge du Capitaine, Stella Baruk recounted in 1985, a problem proposed to primary school students: "On a boat, there are 26 sheep and 10 goats. How old is the captain? Among the 97 students, 76 gave the age of the captain using the numbers in the statement, i.e. 26+10=36, so the captain is 36 years old."

There are two notable unintended consequences. The first can be broken down into several points: the child thinks that a given problem has one answer and one answer only, all the data must be used to arrive at the answer, no additional information is needed, and the solution calls on the knowledge taught. The second is that the student, faced with an exercise, tells themselves that if there was a pitfall, the teacher would have warned him. In this way, the teacher protects their students by ridding them of what seems difficult or out of reach.

The child does not control the meaning of the exercise; they simply respond. The children are aware of the incoherence of the proposition, but the classical didactic contract does not require them to decide on the relevance of the problem.

The teacher's role is to move from a lay culture made of concrete problems to a scientific culture made of abstract and theoretical problems. The lack of logic in the didactic contract is "the lever for the child to pass into a scientific culture" according to Samuel Joshua and Jean-Jacques Dupin in Introduction à la didactique des sciences et des mathématiques, 1933.

=== Other unintended consequences ===
- The Jourdain effect, named after a character in Molière's novel, is a banal behavior of the student that is interpreted as the manifestation of a learned knowledge.
- When a student encounters a difficulty, the Topaz effect, named after a character in Marcel Pagnol, consists, in one way or another, in overcoming it for him or her. The teacher simplifies the task by making the student get the right answer by simply reading the teacher's questions and using prior knowledge. In this way, the teacher takes on the bulk of the work and the targeted knowledge disappears completely.
- The effect of the misunderstood expectation consists in believing that an answer expected from the students is self-evident.
- The metacognitive shift consists in taking a technique, necessary to solve a problem, as the object of study. This results in losing sight of the factual knowledge to be acquired.
- The improper use of analogy results in the replacement of the complex study of a notion that is also complex by that of an analogy. Metaphors are often useful for understanding, but their misuse can restrict the intended concept.
- The Droopy Goofy effect is the sullen or delighted attitude of the teacher when the students receive their proposals (of hypotheses, solutions, etc.), which betrays whether they conform to the teacher's expectations: the students then test their proposals against the teacher's attitude.

== See also ==
- Didactic method
- Pedagogy
- Education Sciences
- Teaching method
