= Negrești-Oaș =

- Town
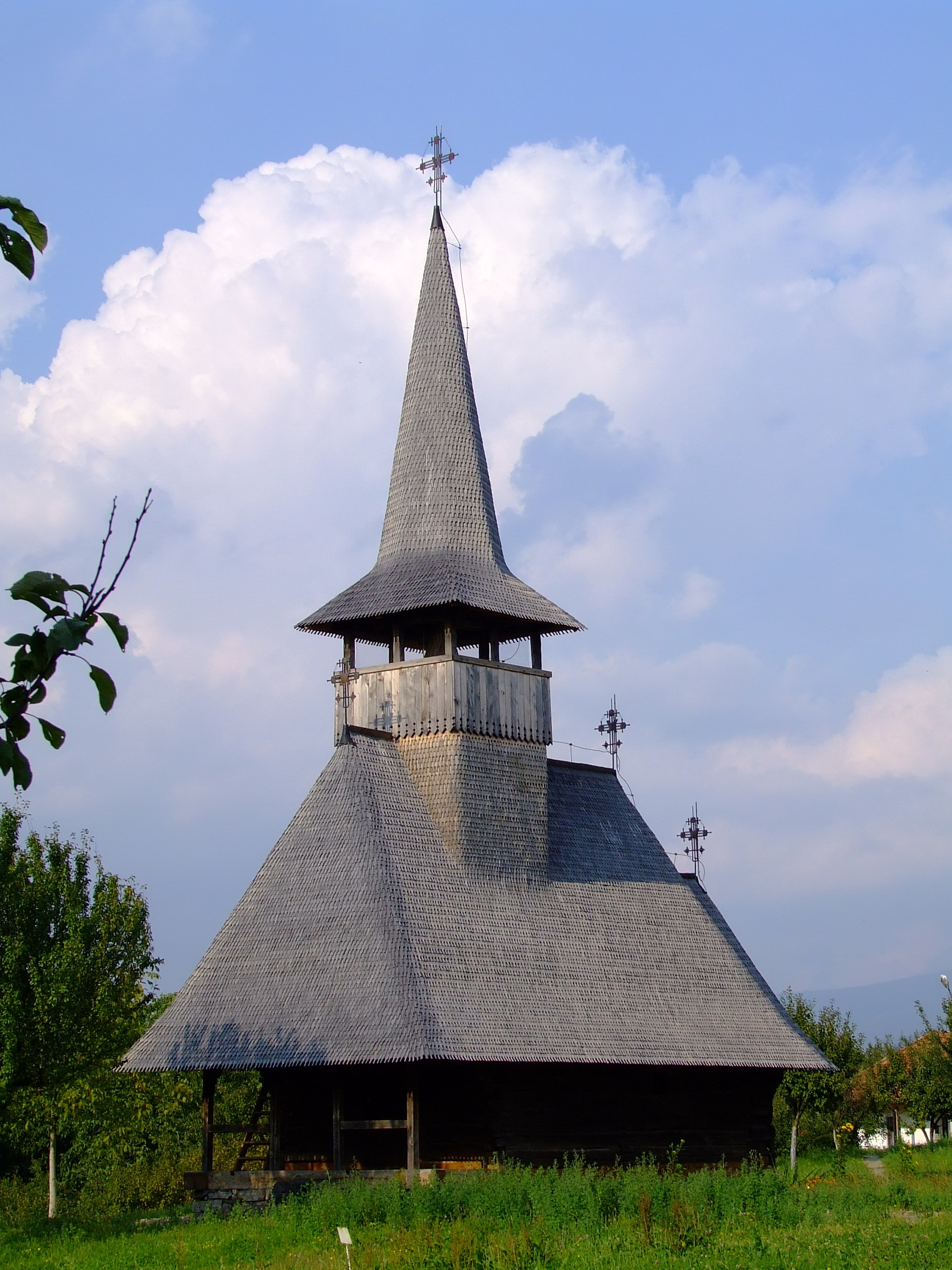
- Lechința Wooden Church, Oaș Country Museum

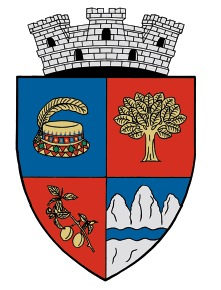
- Coat of arms

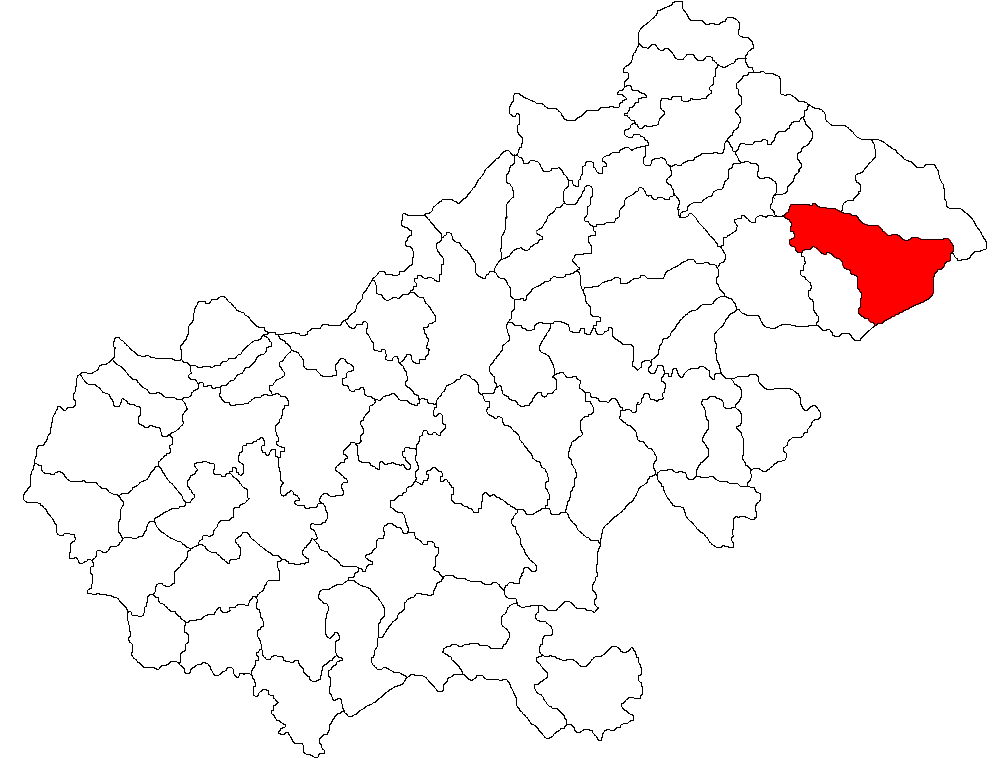
- Location in Satu Mare County

- Location in Romania
- Coordinates: 47°52′10″N 23°25′27″E
- Country: Romania
- County: Satu Mare

Government
  - Mayor (2024–2028): Aurelia Fedorca (PSD)
- Area: 130 km^{2} (50 sq mi)
- Elevation: 223 m (732 ft)
- Population (2021-12-01): 14,616
  - Density: 110/km^{2} (290/sq mi)
- Time zone: UTC+02:00 (EET)
  - Summer (DST): UTC+03:00 (EEST)
- Postal code: 445200
- Area code: (+40) 02 61
- Vehicle reg.: SM
- Website: www.negresti-oas.ro

Negrești-Oaș (Romanian pronunciation: [neˌɡreʃtʲ ˈo̯aʃ]; Hungarian: Avasfelsőfalu, Hungarian pronunciation: [ˈɒvɒʃfɛlʃøːfɒlu]) is a town in northwestern Romania, in the county of Satu Mare. Two villages, Luna (Lunaforrás) and Tur (Túrvékonya), are administered by the town. The town is the capital of the Țara Oașului ethnocultural region.

== Geography ==
Negrești-Oaș is situated at an altitude of 223 m (732 ft), on the banks of the Tur River. It is located in the northeastern part of the county, on the border with Maramureș County, near the Ukrainian border. The town lies at a distance of 50 km (31 mi) east of the county seat, Satu Mare, and about the same distance north of Baia Mare and southwest of Sighetu Marmației.

The town is traversed by national road DN19, which starts in Oradea, runs through Carei, Satu Mare, and Negrești-Oaș, then crosses the Inner Eastern Carpathians at the Huta Pass, and ends in Sighetu Marmației.

== Population ==
Historical population
Year	Pop.	±%
1880	2,771	—
1890	3,260	+17.6%
1900	3,580	+9.8%
1910	4,217	+17.8%
1920	3,554	−15.7%
1930	5,290	+48.8%
1941	5,912	+11.8%
1956	7,348	+24.3%
1966	9,311	+26.7%
1977	12,387	+33.0%
1992	16,648	+34.4%
2002	16,356	−1.8%
2011	11,867	−27.4%
2021	14,616	+23.2%
Source: Census data

At the 2021 census, Negrești-Oaș had a population of 14,616. At the 2011 census, there were 11,867 people living within the town; of those, 95% were ethnic Romanians, while 2.9% were ethnic Hungarians and 1.9% Roma. Furthermore, 72.4% were Romanian Orthodox, 12.6% Jehovah's Witnesses, 4.5% Pentecostal, 3.7% Roman Catholic, 3.4% Greek-Catholic, and 1.6% Reformed.

== Natives ==
- Stelian Baltă, entrepreneur and tech investor
- Oana Gregory (born 1996), actress
- Mihai Ștețca (born 1981), footballer

== Gallery ==
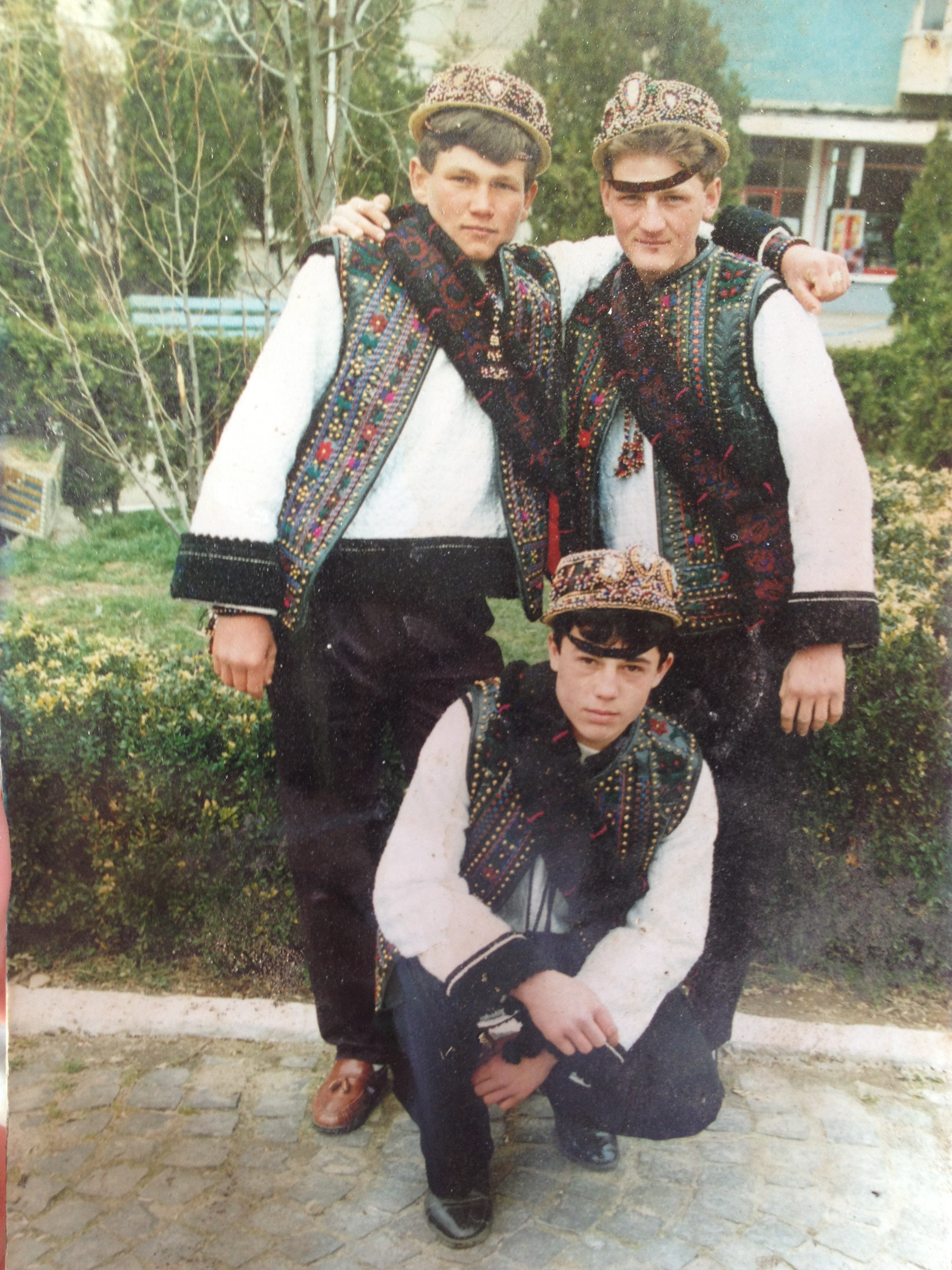
Local boys in traditional costume

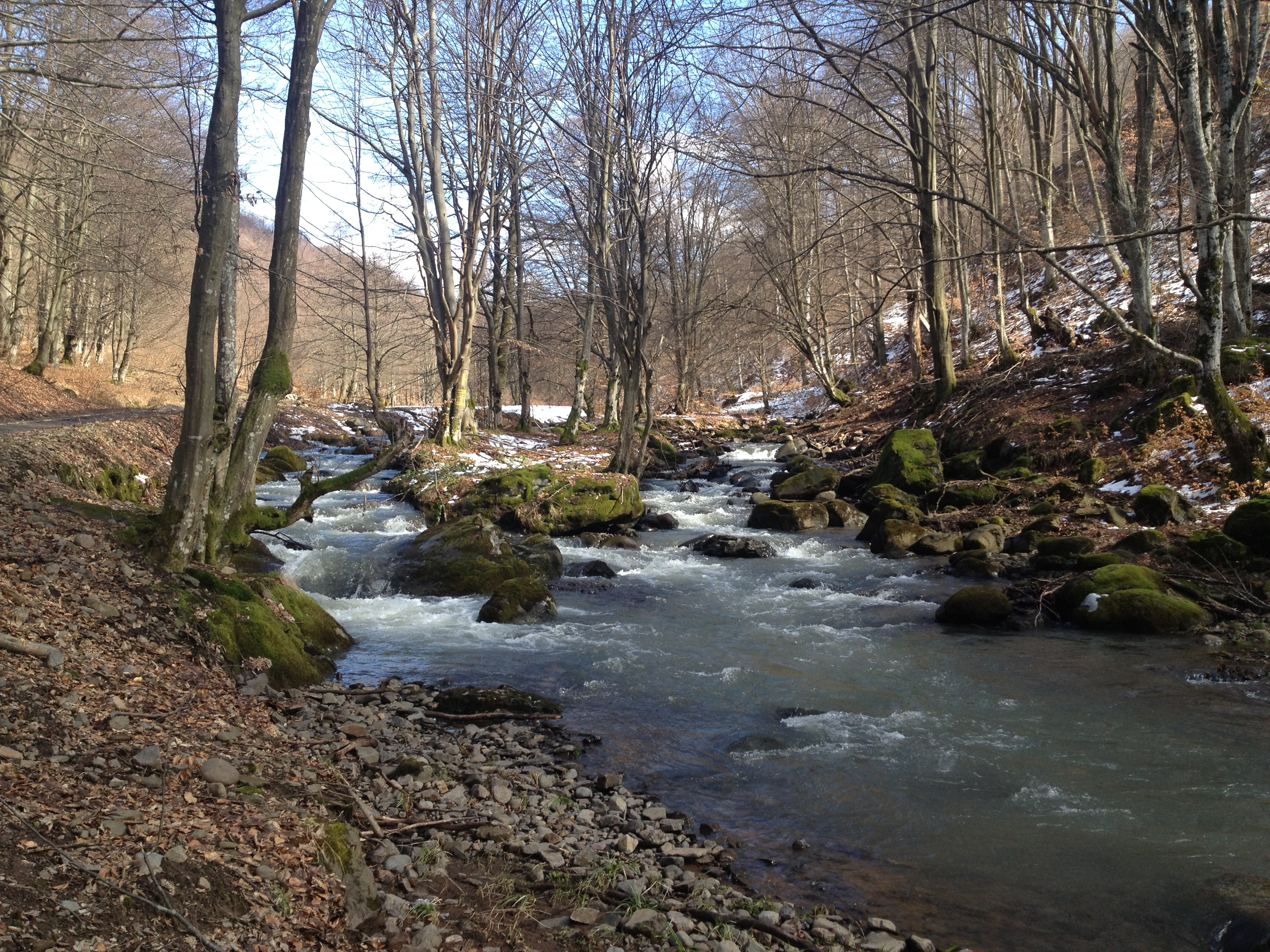
The river Tur in Negrești-Oaș near its source
