= Secondary education in France =

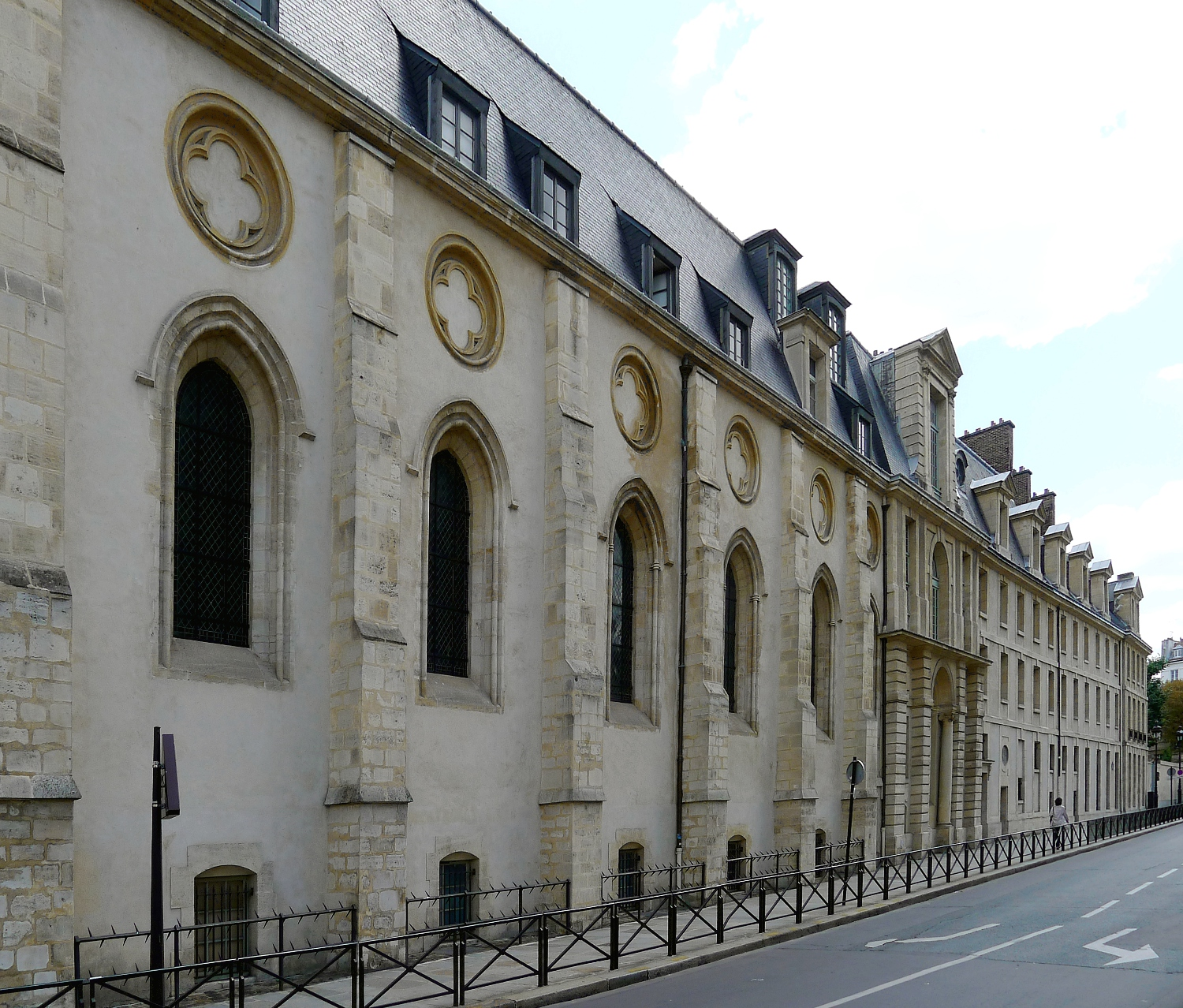
Lycée Henri-IV in Paris

In France, secondary education is in two stages:

- Collèges (French pronunciation: [kɔlɛʒ]) cater for the first four years of secondary education from the ages of 11 to 14.
- Lycées (French pronunciation: [lise]) provide a three-year course of further secondary education for students between the ages of 15 and 19 (although some lycées host higher education courses like CPGE or BTS). Pupils are prepared for the baccalauréat (French pronunciation: [bakaloʁea]; baccalaureate, colloquially known as bac, previously bachot), which can lead to higher education studies or directly to professional life. There are three main types of baccalauréat: the baccalauréat général, baccalauréat technologique and baccalauréat professionnel.

== School year ==
The school year starts in early September and ends in early July. Metropolitan French school holidays are scheduled by the Ministry of Education by dividing the country into three zones (A, B, and C) to prevent overcrowding by family holidaymakers of tourist destinations, such as the Mediterranean coast and ski resorts. Lyon, for example, is in zone A, Marseille is in zone B and Paris and Bordeaux are in zone C.

In contrast to the practice in most other education systems, the school years in France are numbered on a decreasing scale. Thus, pupils begin their secondary education in the sixième (6th class) and transfer to a lycée in the seconde (2nd class). The final year is the terminale.

In French, the word étudiant(e) is usually reserved for university-level students, and collège and lycée students are referred to as élèves ('pupils' or 'students' in English).

The curriculum (programme officiel) is standardized for all French public institutions. Changes to the programme are made every year by the French Ministry of Education and are published in the Ministry's Bulletin officiel de l'Éducation nationale (BO), the official reference bulletin for educators.

== Collège ==
Collège
Age	Name	Abbreviation
11–12	Sixième	6^{e}
12–13	Cinquième	5^{e}
13–14	Quatrième	4^{e}
14–15	Troisième	3^{e}

The collège is the first level of secondary education in the French educational system. A pupil attending collège is called collégien (boy) or collégienne (girl). Men and women teachers at the collège- and lycée-level are called professeur (no official feminine professional form exists in France although the feminine form professeure has appeared and seems to be gaining some ground in usage). The City of Paris refers to a collège in English as a "high school".

Entry in sixième occurs directly after the last year of primary school, called Cours moyen deuxième année (CM2). There is no entrance examination into collège, but administrators have established a comprehensive academic examination of students starting in sixième. The purpose of the examination is evaluating pupils' level on being graduated from primary school.

=== Curriculum ===
Subject	Remarks	Starting in
Humanities and languages
French Language and Literature	Features French and translated foreign works; concentrates on grammar and spelling	6^{e}
History and Geography	French-based, but includes foreign history and geography	6^{e}
A first foreign language^{1}	Known as Première langue vivante (LV1)	6^{e}
A second foreign language^{1} or a French regional language	Deuxième langue vivante (LV2)	6^{e} or 5^{e}
Arts and crafts		6^{e}
Musical education		6^{e}
Civics	Éducation civique	6^{e}
^{1}Available foreign languages include: English, German, Arabic, Spanish, Italian, Portuguese, and Russian; other languages available per locale. Most pupils study English as first foreign language, and Spanish, Italian or German as second foreign language.
Natural and applied sciences
Mathematics		6^{e}
Biology and Geology	Sciences de la vie et de la Terre (SVT)	6^{e}
Technology		6^{e}
Physics and Chemistry		6^{e}
Compulsory courses
Physical Education		6^{e}
Optional courses
Latin		5^{e}
Ancient Greek		3^{e}

The table at the right details the French curriculum. Along with 3-4 weekly hours of physical education, a typical school week consists of some 26 hours of schooling. French language and literature occupy the most time, 4–5 hours per week, followed by 4 hours per week of mathematics; other subjects occupy 1-3.5 hours per week.

The curriculum is devised by the French Ministry of National Education and applies to all collèges in France and also for AEFE-dependent institutions. Académies and individual schools have little margin for curriculum customisation. Teachers compose syllabi per precise government educational regulations and choose textbooks accordingly, and every major French publishing house has a textbook branch.

=== Process and purpose ===
Usually a different professeur or teacher teaches each subject; most teachers teach several different age groups. Collège pupils stay in the same class throughout the school year and in every subject (except for optional courses such as foreign languages, where students from several classes mix), so each year-group is divided into as many classes as necessary. The strong belief in teaching in mixed-ability classes means that streaming occurs only rarely.

Class sizes vary from school to school, but usually range from 20 to 35 pupils. Each class has a professeur principal ('main teacher' or 'class tutor') who acts as the link between the teaching staff, administration and pupils.

Ultimately, the collège has the task of preparing students for the advanced subjects of the lycée. At the end of the troisième class, students sit for le diplôme national du brevet, an end-of-collège examination. The brevet is not required for entrance to the lycée, and passing it does not guarantee that a pupil will progress to the higher-level school.

During the last conseil de classe of the year, held in June, teachers and administrators decide whether or not a pupil can progress to the next year. In deciding, they evaluate the student's skills, participation, and behaviour. One of three outcomes is possible:

1. The student progresses to the next year.
2. Their redoublement (repeating the year) can be required.
3. He or she can, in specific cases, be offered to skip a year and be advanced by two years.

A student asked to repeat a year can appeal said decision. The decision of the appeals council is final.

== Lycée ==
The lycée (pronounced [lise]) is the second and last stage of secondary education in the French educational system. The City of Paris refers to a lycée in English as a "sixth form college". A pupil attending a lycée is a lycéen (masculine) or a lycéenne (feminine).

Until 1959, the term lycée designated a secondary school with a full curriculum (seven years, the present collège + lycée) directly under the supervision of the state, then from 1959 to 1963 any secondary school with a full curriculum. Older lycées still include a collège section, so a pupil attending a lycée may actually be a collégien.

At the end of the final year of schooling, most students take the baccalauréat diploma. There are three main types of baccalauréat, which are completely different from each other: the baccalauréat général (general baccalaureate), the baccalauréat technologique (technological baccalaureate), and the baccalauréat professionnel (professional baccalaureate).

Lycée
Age	Name	Abbreviation
15–16	Seconde	2^{de}
16–17	Première	1^{re}
17–18	Terminale	T^{le}

Lycées are divided into (i) the lycée général, leading to two or more years of post–baccalauréat studies, (ii) the lycée technologique, leading to short-term studies, and (iii) the lycée professionnel, a vocational qualification leading directly to a particular career. General and technological education courses are provided in "standard" lycées, while vocational courses are provided in separate professional lycées.

In practice, competent pupils at a vocational lycée professionnel can also apply to take short-term, post–baccalauréat studies leading to the Brevet de technicien supérieur (BTS), a vocational qualification. That option is available also to pupils at a lycée général.

=== Lycée général and lycée technologique ===
==== General streams (baccalauréat général) ====
In France, the lycée général is the usual stepping stone to university degrees.

Before 2021, the students of the general baccalaureate chose one of three streams (termed séries) in the penultimate lycée year (S for Sciences; ES for Economics and Social sciences; and L for Literature). During the seconde, students mostly take the same courses, despite having different academic skills and interests, so it is usually thought to be an easier year than either the première or the terminale.

The baccalauréat général examination is different for all three séries, and subjects are weighted according to the course taken.

Stream	Description
S scientifique (sciences)	The science stream (bac S – bac scientifique) requires a high level in mathematics, physics, chemistry, biology, geology and, if available, engineering sciences and computer science.
ES économique et social (economics and social sciences)	The bac ES (bac économique et social') requires a high level in economics and social courses of studies; also in mathematics, history and geography.
L littéraire (literature)	The bac L (bac littéraire) weighs French literature, philosophy, foreign languages and the arts heavily. Students in première littéraire (1^{re} L or 1L) have no maths and only a small amount of sciences unless they choose the 'maths' option. Students in Terminale Littéraire (T^{le} L or TL) have no maths, physics and chemistry or biology unless they chose the 'maths' option in 1L.

According to the official statistics, for the 2003–2004 school year, 33 percent of all students chose série S; 19 percent chose série ES; and 11 percent chose série L.

All students take philosophy courses in terminale, while French language classes end in the première, excepting the série L, where they become French literature classes, where pupils are to study two books during the year, from French writers, or foreign books translated into French (e.g., Romeo and Juliet during the school year 2007–2008, or The Leopard from Italian author Giuseppe Tomasi di Lampedusa).

There also is a required option for further specialisation in all séries, although it is restricted to the chosen course. For example, a student in série S can choose to specialise in mathematics, physics, "SVT" (biology and geology) or "engineering sciences" but not in philosophy.

A student in série L can choose to specialise in one of their foreign languages (English being the most popular), a third foreign language or an extinct language such as Latin, or one of the following arts: music, theatre, circus, plastiques. Specialisation adds a separate, weekly two-hour class in the chosen discipline; also, it increases the weight of the chosen subject at the baccalauréat. The syllabus in the specialisation class is unrelated to the material learned in the common class. Specialisation plays no role in the choice of a post–secondary career or subject at university, except for a few courses aimed for students from a given série that can also accept students from other séries if they have taken a given specialisation.

Starting from the 2020–21 academic year, the S, ES and L streams of the general baccalauréat were retired. Students of the general baccalaureate now choose three specialty courses, then keep two in the final year. There are 12 specialties, which vary in their availability depending on the school: arts, ecology, history & geography, humanities, languages, literature, mathematics, computer science, physics & chemistry, economic and social sciences, engineering sciences, biology & geology. These specialties are added to a part common to all: French, philosophy, history & geography, languages, sciences, sport. A large part of the examinations are now done over the school year but the students also have final exams in their 2 specialties as well as in philosophy, added to a general oral examination.

==== Technical streams (baccalauréat technologique) ====
After the seconde, students can also go on the lycée technologique to obtain the baccalauréat technologique. It includes eight other streams, called séries technologiques:

- sciences et technologies de la gestion (Management Sciences and Technologies, STG — replaced sciences et technologies tertiaires (Service Sciences and Technologies, STT) for the June 2007 exam
- sciences et technologies de l'industrie et du développement durable (Industrial Science and Technologies and sustainable development, STI2D)
- sciences et technologies de laboratoire (Laboratory Science and Technologies, STL)
- sciences médico-sociales (Health and Social Sciences, SMS): The name was changed in 2007 and became: Sciences et technologies de la santé et du social (Sciences and Technologies in Health and Social, ST2S)
- sciences et technologies du produit agroalimentaire (Food Science and Technologies, STPA)
- sciences et technologies de l'agronomie et de l'environnement (Agronomy and Environment Science and Technologies, STAE)
- techniques de la musique et de la danse (Music and Dance Techniques, TMD)
- hôtellerie (Hospitality management)

The STPA and STAE stream are available only in lycées agricoles, speciality schools for agricultural sciences.

The teaching of the lessons is based on inductive reasoning and experimentation. It allows you to work or to pursue short and technical studies (laboratory, design and applied arts, hotel and restaurant, management etc.).

=== Lycée professionnel ===
The lycée professionnel leads to the baccalauréat professionnel. The courses are designed for students who do not plan to continue into higher education. The vocational training is for craftspeople and involves internships in commercial enterprises. The courses are suitable for students who are more interested in a hands-on educational approach than in academic schooling. There are nearly 100 specialties, including: Leather crafts; Building technician; Maintenance of industrial equipment; Cooking; Road freight transport driver; Butcher, etc and others.

== Carte scolaire ==
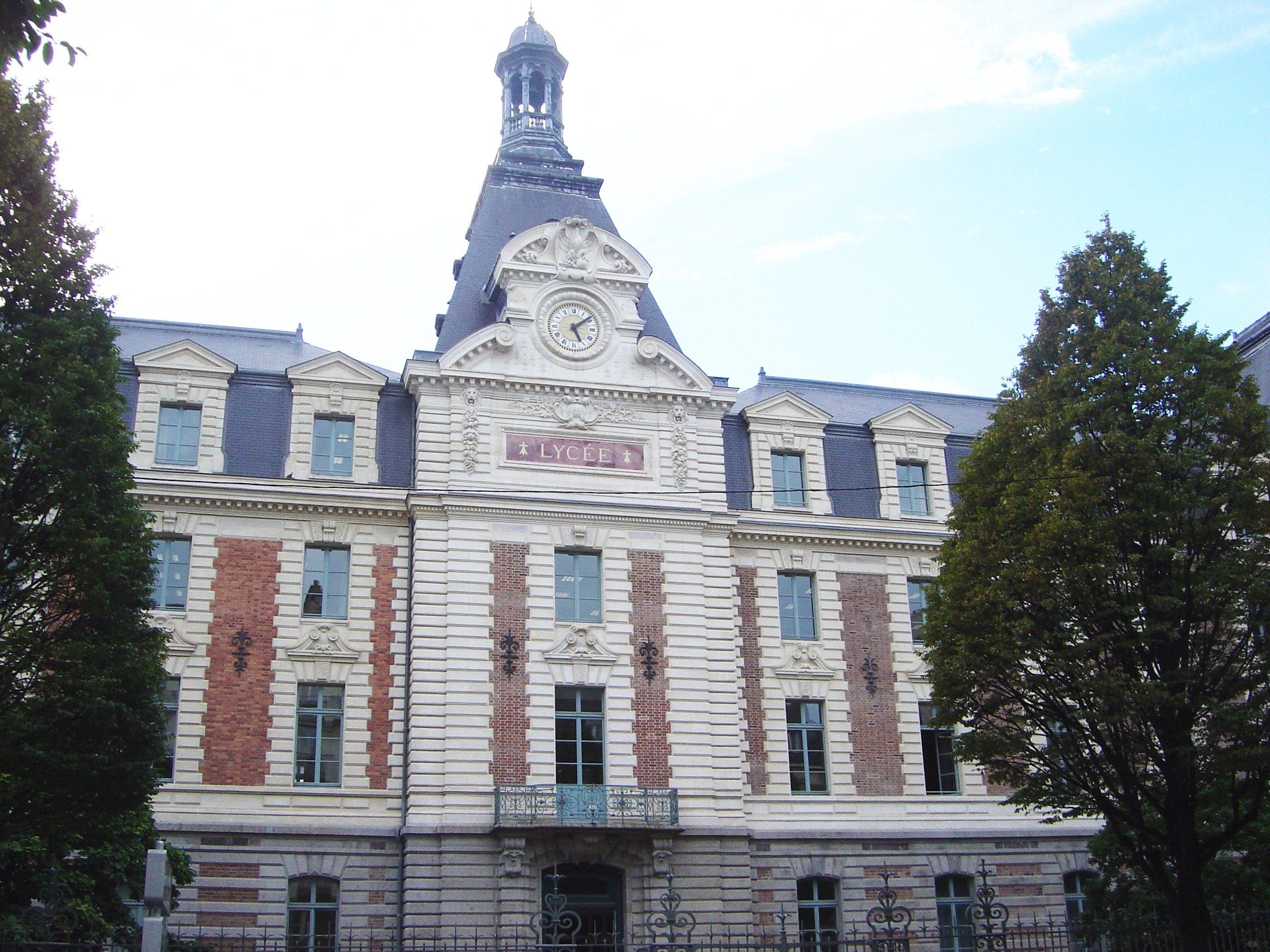
A lycée in Rennes, from the 19th century.

French parents are not free to choose the state school that their children will attend; unless the children have special learning needs, they will attend the school allocated to them by the carte scolaire (school map). Reasons for attending a state school that is not their nearest include studying an option unavailable in the school to which they were originally assigned, such as a rare foreign language.

For many reasons, many parents consider the allocated school standards inadequate, the teaching poor, and particularly if they do not like the idea of their children mixing with some of the other pupils at the school. In any city, there are "better" lycées and collèges, which parents would prefer their children attend. The two main methods used in such circumstances to get children into a school other than their assigned school are :

- paying for private schooling;
- having the child choose an unusual option (e.g. Ancient Greek or Latin) available only in the preferred school.

A similar trick is used if some classes in a school are seen as "better" than others. For organisational reasons, students taking certain options are grouped into special classes, which may be academically attractive. They typically include classes taking German as a first foreign language, or Latin or Ancient Greek as options.

== See also ==
- Baccalauréat
- Grandes écoles
- Education in France
- Agency for French Education Abroad
- French language education in Egypt
- Literary commentary in the French baccalaureate
