= Stella Koutros =

American cancer epidemiologist

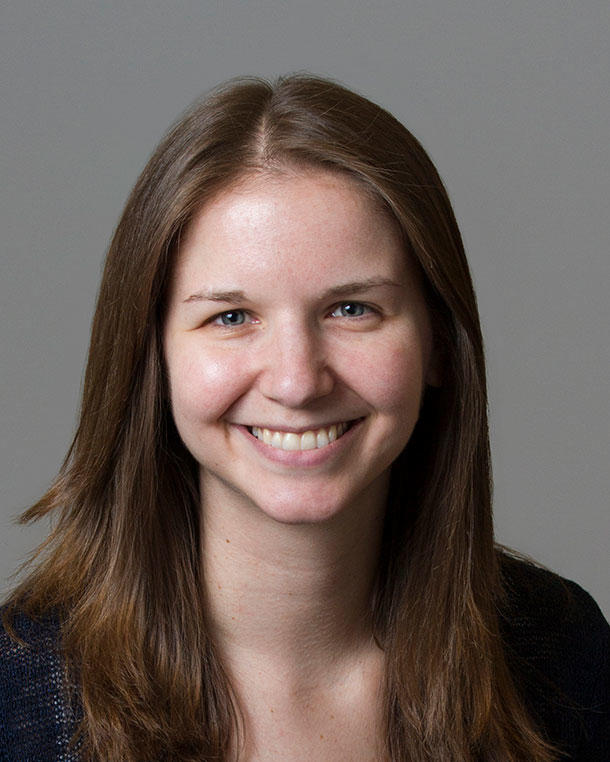
- Koutros in 2019
- Education: Yale University
- Scientific career
- Fields: Cancer epidemiology
- Workplaces: National Cancer Institute
- Doctoral advisor: Tongzhang Zheng

Stella Koutros is an American cancer epidemiologist who researches the occupational exposures as risk factors for cancer. She is an investigator in the occupational and environmental epidemiology branch at the National Cancer Institute.

== Life ==
Koutros completed a M.P.H. and Ph.D. in epidemiology from Yale School of Public Health and Yale Graduate School of Arts and Sciences. She completed her doctoral work through the Yale-National Cancer Institute (NCI) partnership training program in cancer epidemiology, conducting research in the NCI occupational and environmental epidemiology branch (OEEB). Her 2008 dissertation was titled, A prospective follow-up study of pesticide exposure, dietary intakes, and genetic polymorphisms and the risk of prostate cancer. Tongzhang Zheng was her doctoral advisor. In 2008, upon completion of her doctorate, she became a fellow in OEEB.

Koutros was appointed to the position of tenure-track investigator in 2015. Her research involves the design and conduct of epidemiological investigations to evaluate occupational exposures as risk factors for cancer. She employs exposure assessment methods and molecular studies within highly exposed populations to identify the etiology and clarify the biological mechanisms underlying chemical-induced carcinogenesis. Areas of interest include exposures occurring in the workplace and those contributing to the etiology of bladder cancer.
