= Stylianos (name) =

Stylianos (Greek: Στυλιανός) is a Greek given name meaning pillar. Stylianos may refer to:

- Stylianos of Paphlagonia (fl. late-6th century), patron saint of children
- Stylianos Zaoutzes (died 899), Byzantine official and father-in-law of emperor Leo VI
- Stylianos Gonatas (1876–1966), Greek general and politician, Prime Minister of Greece 1922–1924
- Stylianos Miliadis (1881–1965), Greek painter
- Stylianos Mavromichalis (1902–1981), Greek politician
- Stylianos Kyriakides (1910–1987), Greek Cypriot runner
- Stylianos Pattakos (1912–2016), Greek Army officer, one of the leaders of the Greek military junta of 1967–1974
- Archbishop Stylianos of Australia (1935–2019)
- Stylianos Lenas (1931–1957), Cypriot EOKA fighter
- Stylianos Giannakopoulos (born 1974), Greek footballer

== See also ==
- Stelios, the diminutive form of the name
- Stiliyan
