= Stelios =

Stelios (Greek: Στέλιος) or formally Stylianos (Greek: Στυλιανός) is a Greek first name. This name is given to honor St. Stylianos, a Greek Orthodox saint, the protector of children. The name is derived from the Greek word στύλος (stylos) that means "pillar".

Notable people and characters with the name include:

== People ==
- Stelios Arcadiou (better known as Stelarc), performance artist
- Stelios Constantas, singer
- Stelios Giannakopoulos, association football player
- Sir Stelios Haji-Ioannou, owner of easyGroup
- Stelios Kazantzidis, singer and novelist
- Stel Pavlou, writer and television host
- Stelios Phili, songwriter and record producer
- Stélios Vlavianós, composer, musical arranger
- Stelios Kosmidis, footballer and hair transplant supervisor

== Character ==
- Stelios, character in the film 300, played by Michael Fassbender

== See also ==
- Stylianos, the longer, formal name
