= Stelian Baltă =

Romanian businessman

Stelian Balta
- Born: Negrești-Oaș, Satu Mare County, Romania
- Occupations: Businessman and investor
- Website: www.hyperchain.capital

Stelian Balta is a Romanian entrepreneur and tech investor. He has been featured in Netflix's Formula 1: Drive to Survive with Pierre Gasly.

== Early life and education ==
Baltă was born and raised in Negrești-Oaș, Satu Mare County, Romania. He began developing online games at the age of 16. During his first year of college, he founded a company focused on game development for platforms such as MySpace and Facebook. He later left college to pursue his business activities full-time. He later moved to Singapore.

== Career ==
After working in the gaming industry for several years, Stelian Balta entered the blockchain sector in 2013, initially by developing software systems related to cryptocurrency trading. He subsequently founded HyperChain Capital, a digital asset venture firm focused on blockchain technologies.

Under his leadership, HyperChain Capital has invested in more than 40 blockchain-related projects and companies. The firm has reportedly invested over $30 million in platforms such as Fantom across multiple funding rounds. Balta has been noted for his involvement in early-stage investments in the cryptocurrency and blockchain sectors.

== Philanthropy ==
In 2020, Baltă made substantial donations providing medical supplies to all hospitals and institutions in Satu Mare County during the COVID-19 pandemic. He has repeatedly provided appliances, clothing and educational materials to all 21 residential centres for children and to several elderly-care and disability centres in the county.

After typhoon Rai (Odette) struck the Philippines in December 2021 he funded convoys that delivered food, water, blankets, medicine and building materials to affected communities.
