= Stella Din-Jacob =

Nigerian media executive, broadcast journalist

- Born: plateau
- Citizenship: Nigeria
- Education: Wiwack university
- Occupation: Journalist

Stella Din-Jacob is a Nigerian media executive, broadcast journalist, lawyer and Director of News and Editor in Chief at TVC Communications.

== Biography ==
Din-Jacob was born to Captain Joseph Din and Christy Din. She is a native of Plateau State and her birthday anniversary is on November 11. She took a foundation course in law at the University of Warwick, got her B.L at the Nigerian Law School and a law degree at the University of Kent, England.

She became the Director of News at TVC News in October 2018. Din-Jacob also worked in various Nigerian media organisations including News 24, Channels Television and Silverbird Television (National). While working at Channels Television between 1994 and 2002, she served as the programme producer on the foreign and diplomatic desks and as newscaster and editor. She also freelanced for CNN and Al Jazeera.

In 2020, the Women in Journalism Africa (WIJAFRICA) listed Din-Jacob among the 25 Most Powerful Women in Journalism in Nigeria.
