= Stella Baruk =

French mathematician

Stella Baruk (born 1932 in Yazd, Iran) is an influential Iranian-born French teacher, mathematician, author and educationalist. Since the 1970s she has been a key innovator in the teaching of mathematics in French schools.

== Biography ==
Stella Baruk was born in Iran to a Jewish family; her father is from Turkey and her mother from Palestine (region). Both of her parents were teachers at schools run by the Alliance Israélite Universelle and were deeply immersed in the French culture and language they taught. Her family lived in Syria and then in Lebanon, where she attended the French high school. She then studied at the Beirut Center for Mathematical Studies for three years.

She settled in France in the late 1950s and taught mathematics at private middle and high schools, then at an IMP, where she was confronted with the academic failure of the students enrolled there. Drawing on these experiences, she sought to address the challenges associated with teaching mathematics and to develop new teaching methods. Invited to share her insights at the height of the “modern math” reform, her first book, Échec et maths, was published in 1973. Its impact brought about major changes in her life. Invited to most French-speaking countries, she gave lectures, conducted teacher training sessions, proposed her methods for teaching mathematics in elementary school in France and New Caledonia, and wrote books on mathematics education with a focus on popular science. In 2008, she was named a Knight of the Legion of Honour, and on December 30, 2016, she was promoted to the rank of Officer.

== Works ==
- Echec et maths (Seuil, 1973)
- Fabrice ou l'école des mathématiques (Seuil, 1977)
- L'Âge du capitaine – de l'erreur en mathématiques (Seuil, 1985)
- Dictionnaire de mathématiques élémentaires (Seuil, 1992)
- C’est-à-dire, en mathématiques ou ailleurs (Seuil, 1993)
- Comptes pour petits et grands, vol. 1, Pour un apprentissage du nombre et de la numération fondé sur la langue et le sens (Magnard, 1997)
- Comptes pour petits et grands, vol. 2, Pour un apprentissage des opérations, des calculs, et des problèmes, fondé sur la langue et le sens (Magnard, 2003)
- Si 7=0 – Quelles mathématiques pour l'école? (Odile Jacob, 2004)
- Naître en français (Gallimard, 2006) – texte autobiographique
- Dico de Mathématiques (collège et CM2), (Seuil, 2008)
- Pour une intelligence du nombre (Seuil, à paraître)
- Mes premières mathématiques avec Némo et Mila CP(Magnard, 2012)
- Nombres à compter et à raconter, (Seuil, 2014)
- Les chiffres ? Même pas peur !, (Puf, 2016)

== Decoration ==
- On 2 December 2008, she was made a chevalier of the Légion d'honneur. She was promoted to officier on 30 December 2016.
