= List of Daughters of the American Revolution members =

List of members of the Daughters of the American Revolution

The National Society Daughters of the American Revolution is a lineage-based membership service organization for women who are directly descended from a patriot of the American Revolutionary War. Notable members and former members includes the following list.

== Living members ==
A'Lelia Bundles

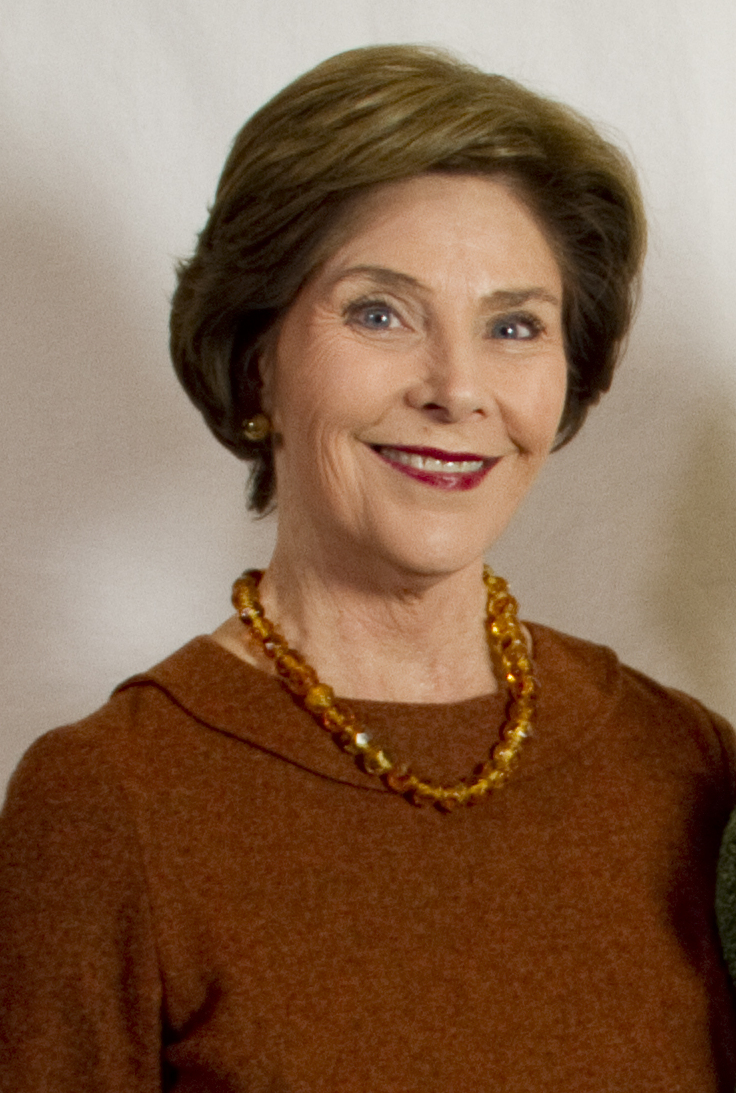
Laura Bush

Bo Derek

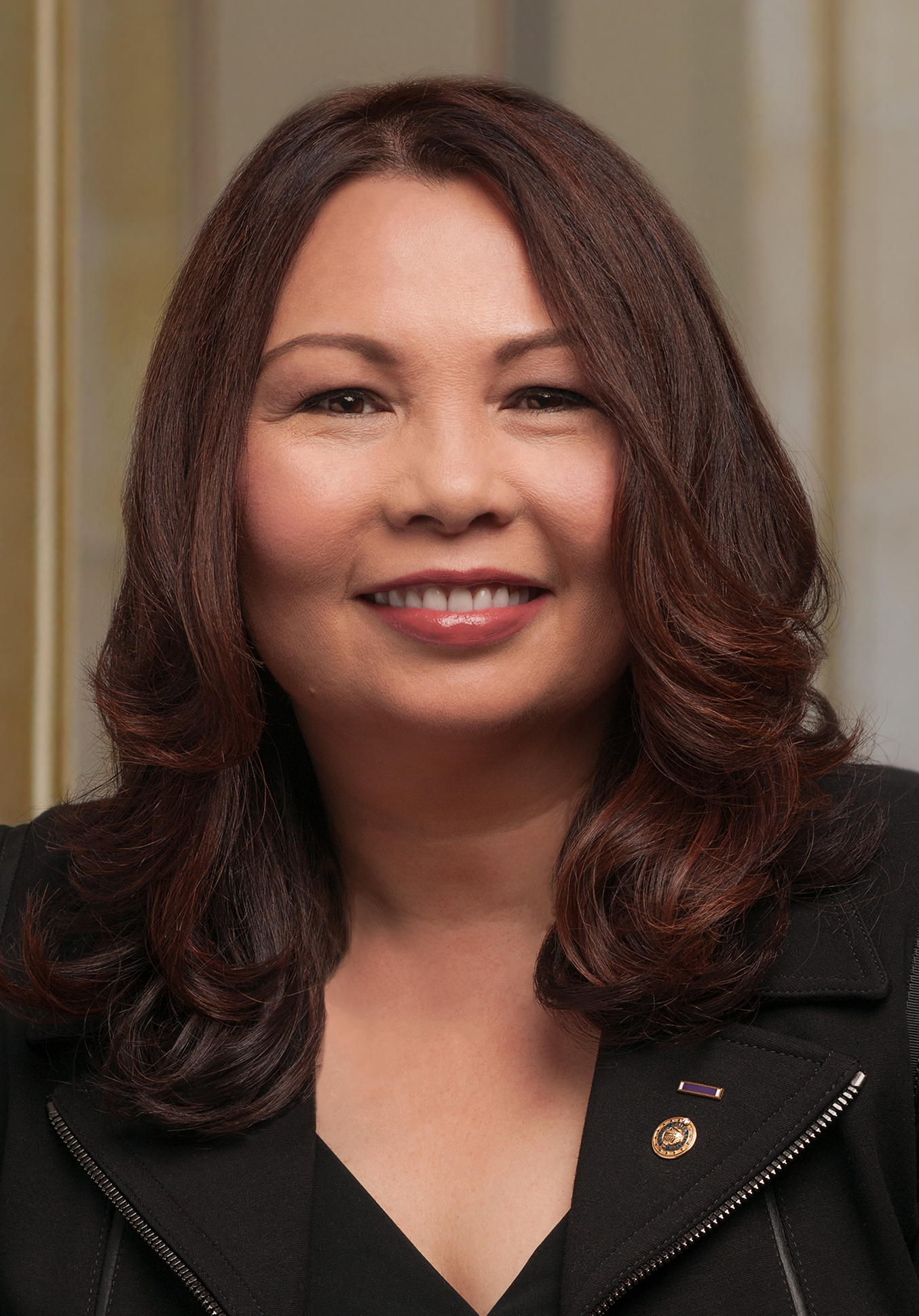
Tammy Duckworth

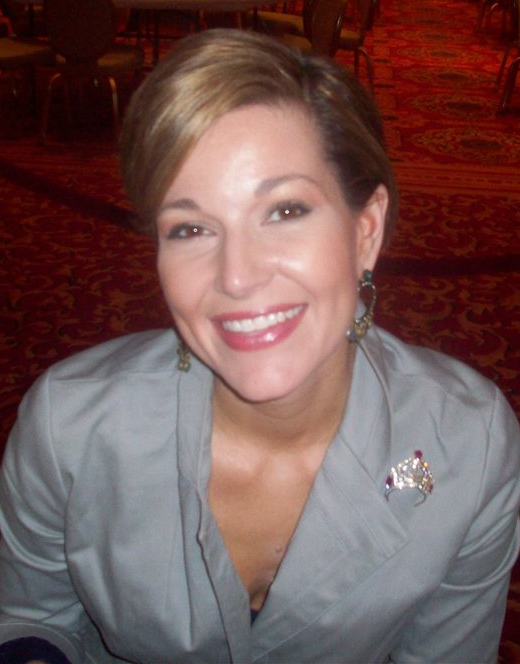
Heather French Henry

MK Pritzker

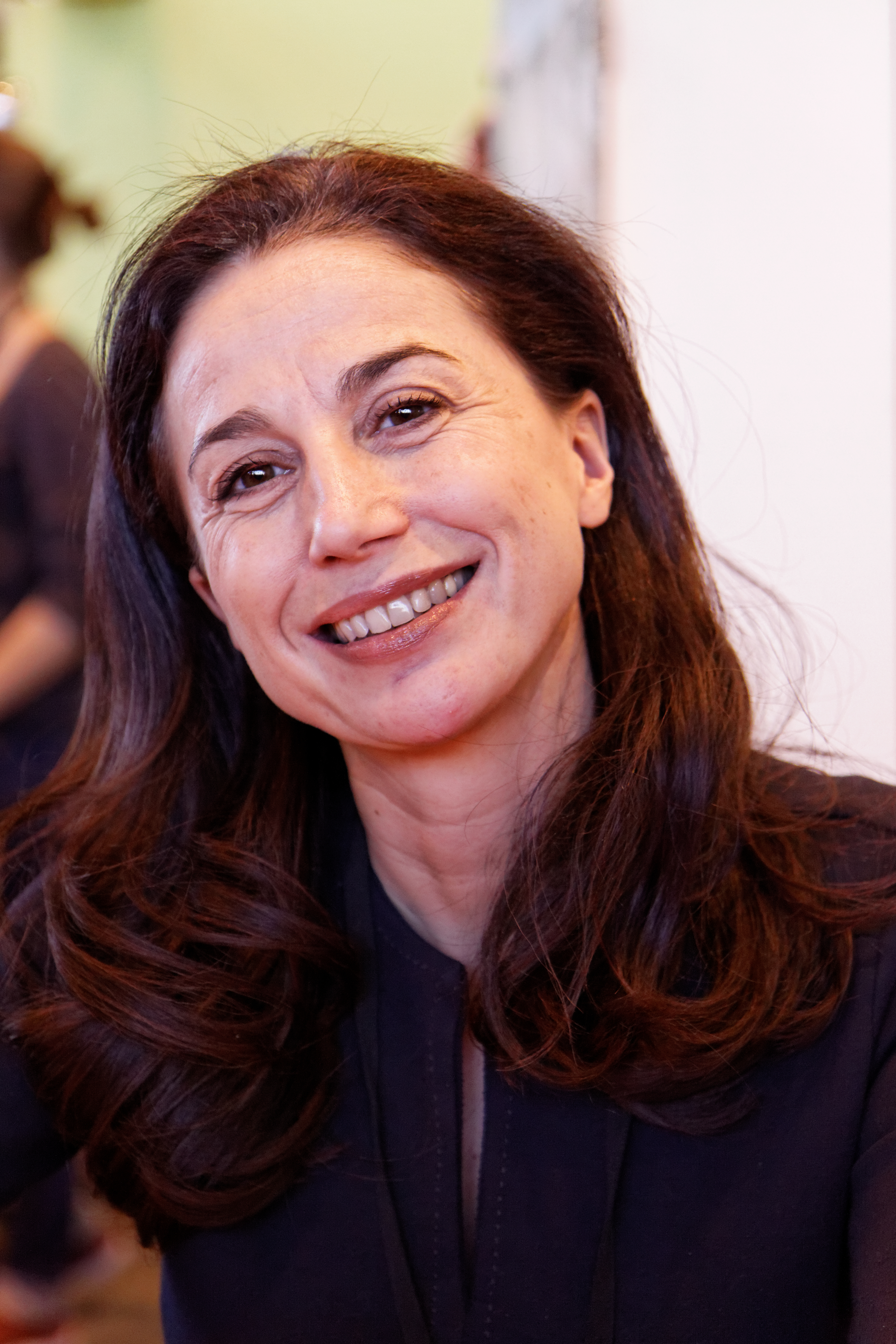
Marie Laurence de Rochefort

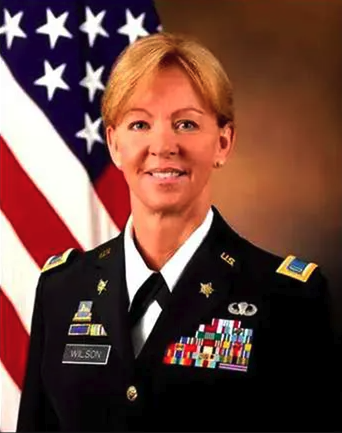
Phyllis J. Wilson

- Martha Barnhart, civic leader, former NSDAR treasurer general and former Indiana State Regent NSDAR
- Karen Batchelor, American lawyer and genealogist and the first-reported African American member of the DAR
- Betsy Boze, American academic, chief executive officer and dean, Kent State University Stark
- Ada E. Brown (born 1974), first African American woman federal judge appointed by President Donald Trump and confirmed by the Senate, first African American woman on the United States District Court for the Northern District of Texas, and second Native American woman to become a federal judge
- Patricia M. Bryson, president general of the United Daughters of the Confederacy
- A'Lelia Bundles (born 1952), journalist, news producer, author, and great-great-granddaughter of Madam C. J. Walker
- Carol Burnett (born 1933), actress, singer, and comedian
- Dymond Bush, Miss Black Rhode Island USA 2016
- Laura Bush (born 1946), former first lady of the United States
- Linda Gist Calvin, businesswoman and 41st NSDAR President General
- Dianne Cannestra, quilter and President National of the United States Daughters of 1812
- Rosanne Cash (born 1955), singer-songwriter
- Kristin Cooper (born 1956), First Lady of North Carolina
- Donna L. Crisp (born 1949), Rear Admiral in the U.S. Navy
- Bo Derek (born 1956), actress, former model, and veterans advocate
- Amy Dickinson (born 1959), journalist
- Ann Turner Dillon, 44th NSDAR President General
- Elizabeth Dole (born 1936), former U.S. Senator from North Carolina, former transportation secretary, labor secretary, American Red Cross president, Federal Trade Commissioner, presidential candidate, and presidential advisor
- Tammy Duckworth (born 1968), American Army veteran, former U.S. representative, and from 2017, U.S. senator from Illinois. Duckworth is depicted along with Molly Pitcher in a statue sponsored by the DAR Illinois chapter and dedicated to women veterans on the grounds of the Brehm Memorial Library in Mt. Vernon, Illinois
- Jane Grier Durden, president general of the United Daughters of the Confederacy
- Sharon Fort, substance abuse counselor and first African-American member of the Arkansas DAR
- Laura Jane Fraser, author and journalist
- Johnette Gordon-Weaver, historian, civil rights activist, and first African-American member of the Williamsburg Chapter of DAR
- Julie Noegel Hardaway, president-general of the United Daughters of the Confederacy
- Heather French Henry (born 1974), Miss America 2000, former Commissioner of the Kentucky Department of Veterans Affairs, and former Second Lady of Kentucky
- Corinne Hoch, vice president general of the United Daughters of the Confederacy
- Kay Ivey (born 1944), Governor of Alabama
- Candace Whittemore Lovely (born 1953), painter
- Regina Lynch-Hudson, publicist, historian and first African-American member of the Greenlee Chapter of DAR
- Laura W. Murphy (born 1955), lobbyist, civil rights activist, and former director of the Washington Legislative Office for the American Civil Liberties Union
- Donna Nelson (born 1954), chemistry professor
- Kristi Noem (born 1971), American politician, former United States Secretary of Homeland Security, former governor of South Dakota, former U.S. congresswoman
- Katie Pavlich (born 1988), conservative commentator, author, blogger, and podcaster
- Katie Ann Powell, 2024 Miss District of Columbia
- Mary Kathryn Muenster Pritzker (born 1967), First Lady of Illinois
- Virginie de Pusy Lafayette (born 1970), French aristocrat
- Reisha Raney, business executive, engineer, podcaster, and first African-American state officer of the Maryland DAR
- Marie Laurence de Rochefort, French aristocrat, socialite, television personality, and writer
- Abigail Salisbury, member of the Pennsylvania House of Representatives
- Sarah Huckabee Sanders (born 1982), Governor of Arkansas
- Margaret Rhea Seddon (born 1947), NASA astronaut
- Alice Schroeder (born 1956), financial journalist, executive, and author
- Sheryl Sims, American quilter and first African-American member of the Nelly Custis Chapter of DAR
- Marjorie McKenney Stone (born 1923), military veteran of World War II
- Ginnie Sebastian Storage, 47th DAR President General
- Roberta Tidmore (born 1922), military veteran of World War II
- Denise Doring VanBuren, 45th NSDAR President General and Miss Teen New York 1979
- Wilma Vaught (born 1930), American military officer and first woman to reach the rank of brigadier general from the comptroller field
- Presley Merritt Wagoner, 40th NSDAR President General
- Kara Westercamp, Associate White House Counsel and judge on the United States Court of International Trade
- Maria Williams-Cole, first African-American member of the DAR in Prince George's County, Maryland
- Phyllis J. Wilson, 5th Command Chief Warrant Officer of the US Army Reserve and President of the Military Women's Memorial
- Pamela Rouse Wright, 46th NSDAR President General
- Lynn Forney Young, 43rd NSDAR President General and commissioner for the United States Semiquincentennial

== Deceased members ==
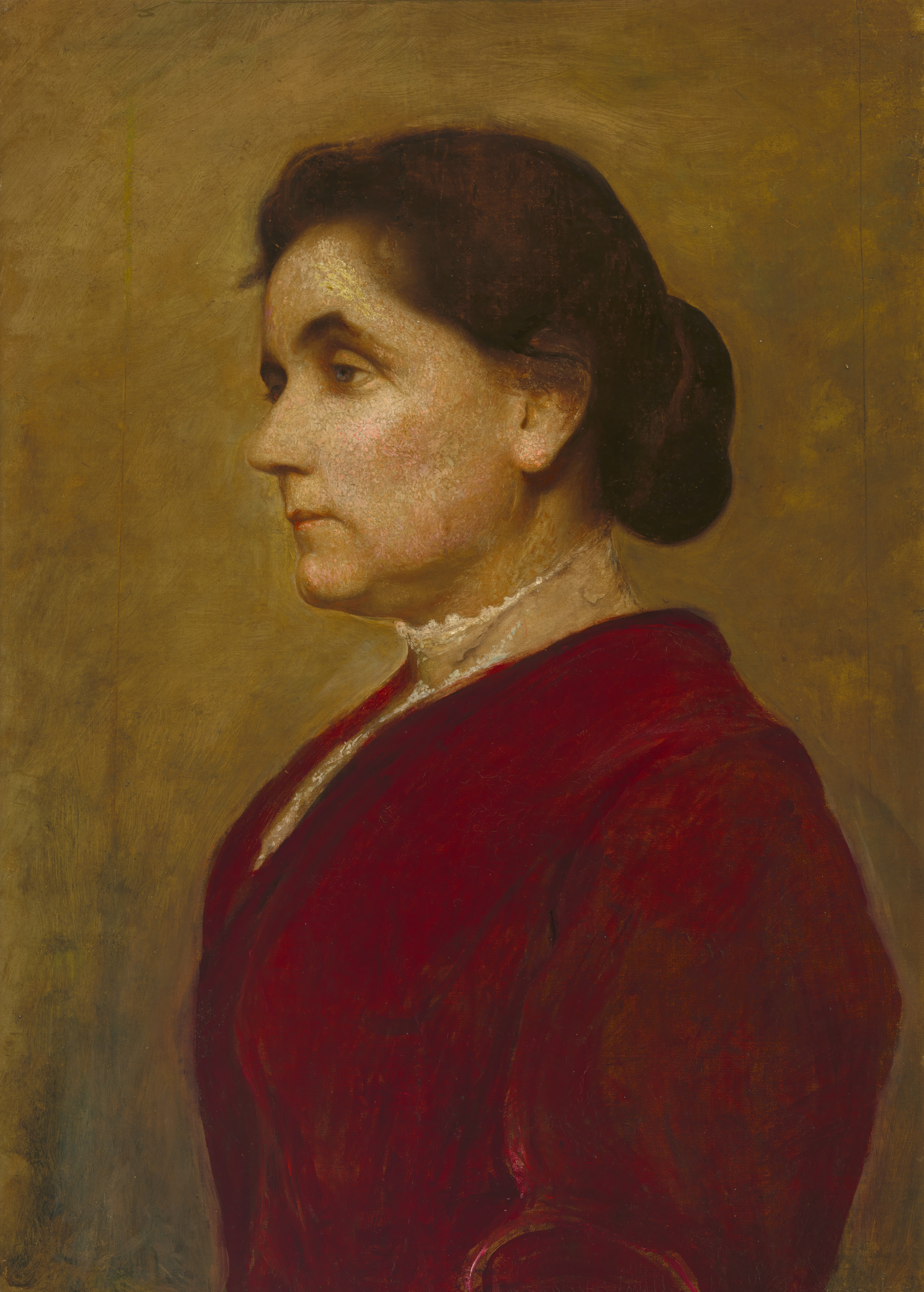
Jane Addams

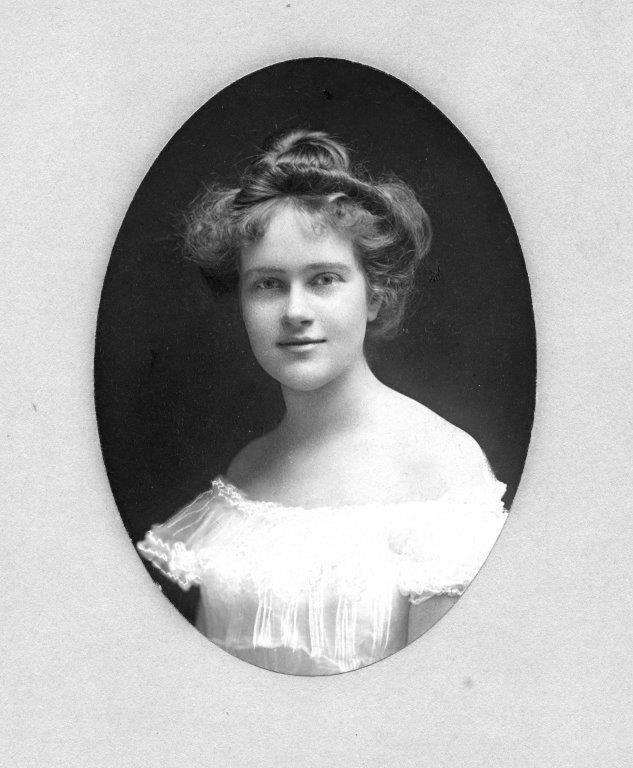
Julia McGehee Alexander

Susan B. Anthony

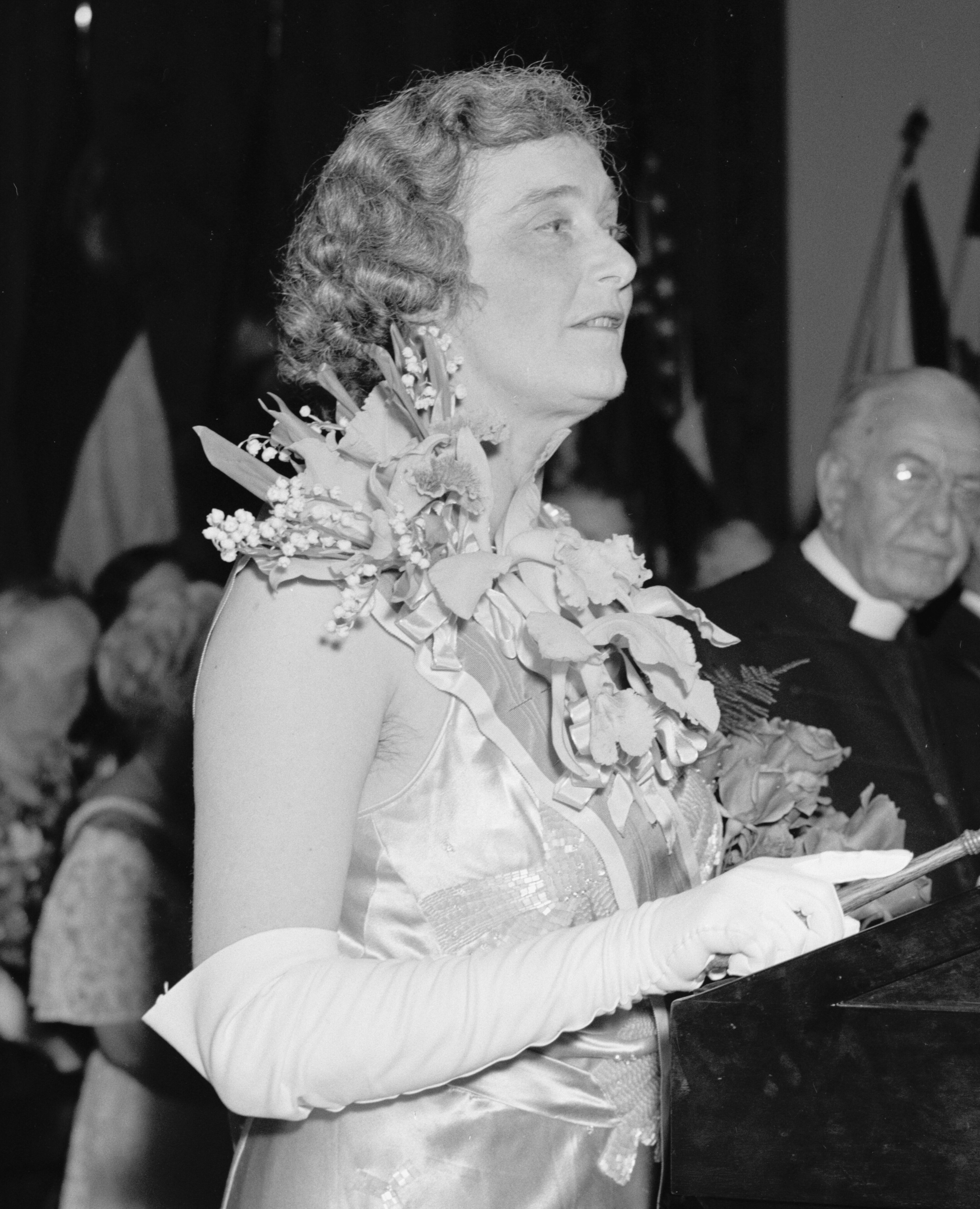
Florence Hague Becker

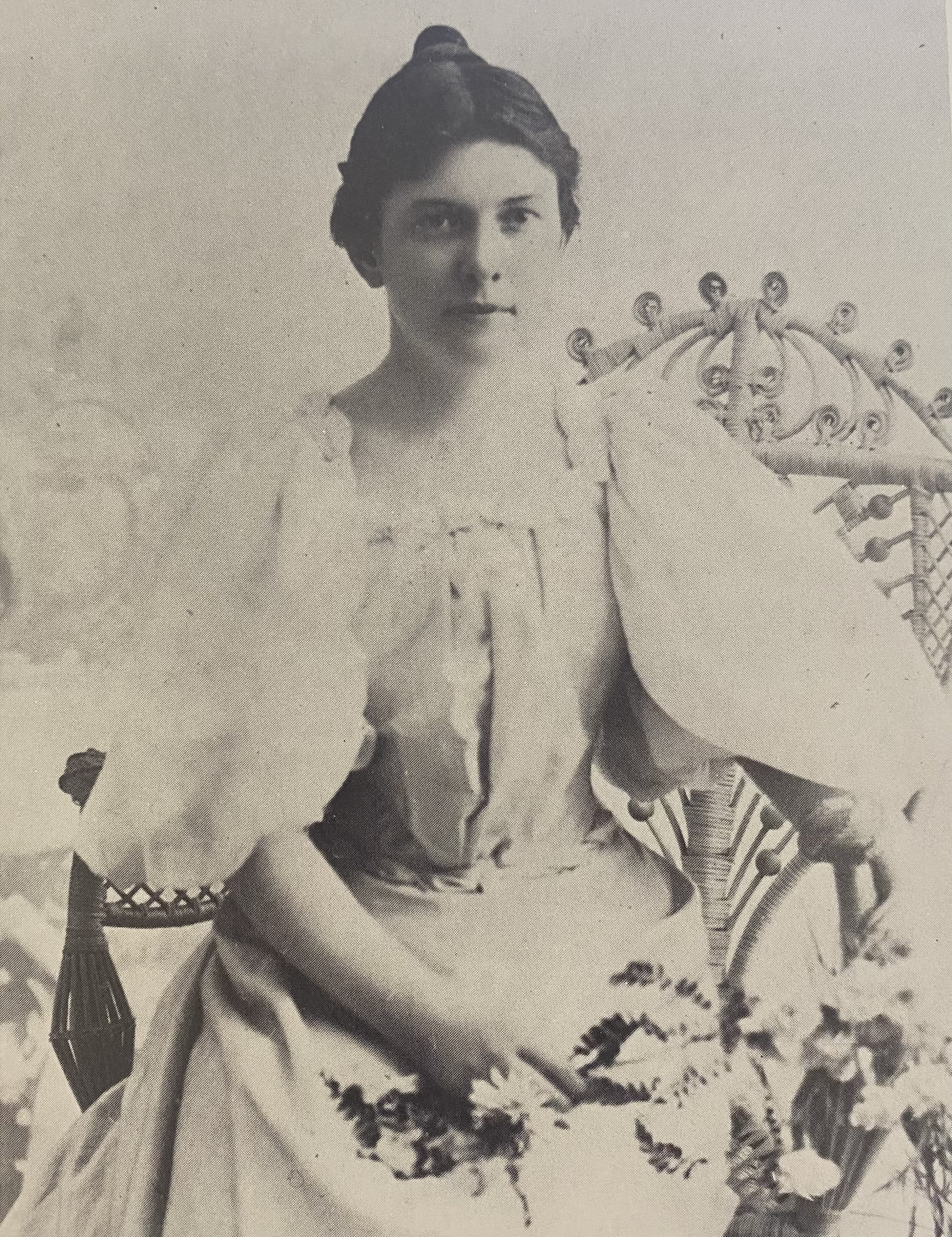
Fanny Yarborough Bickett

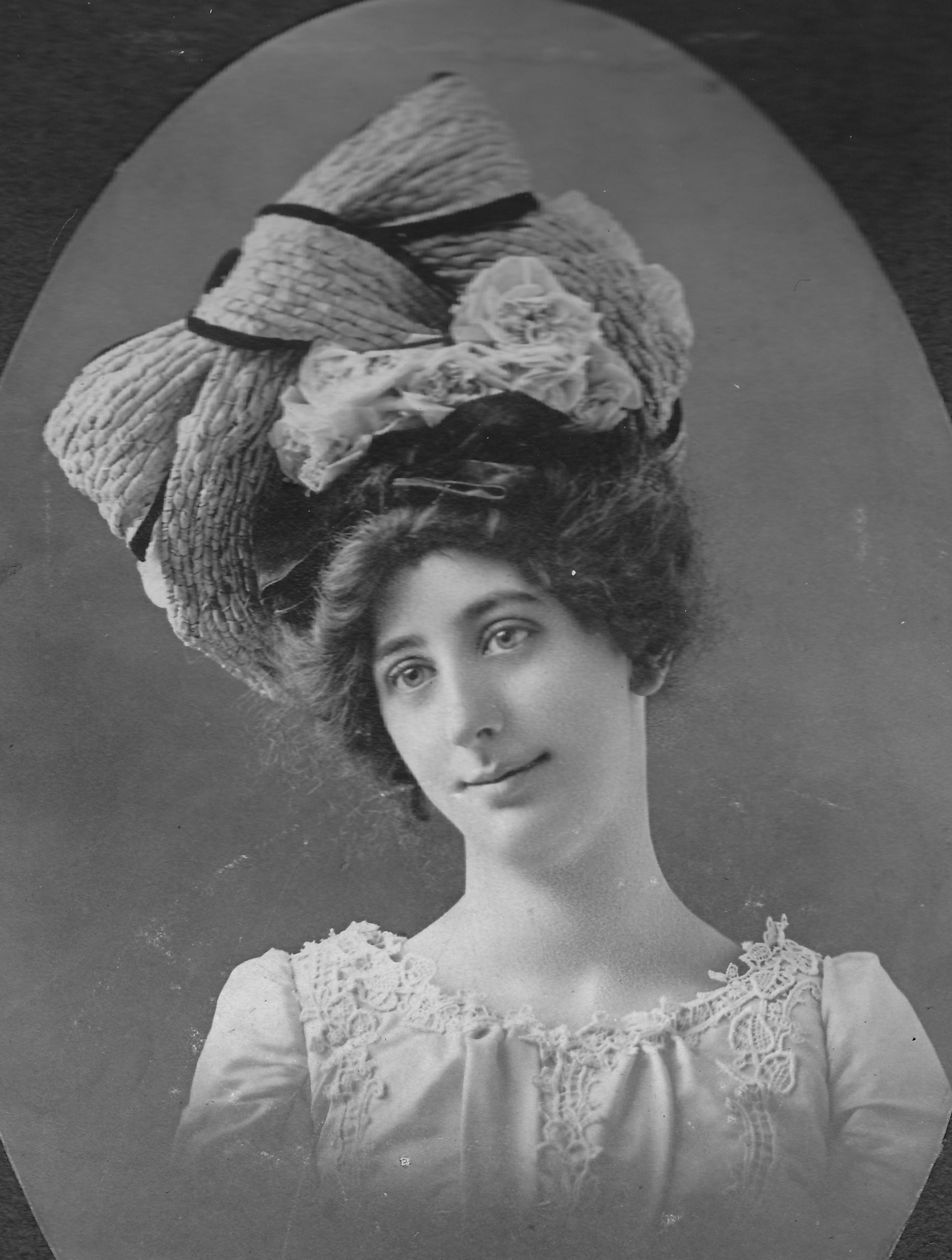
Leah Kepner Boyce

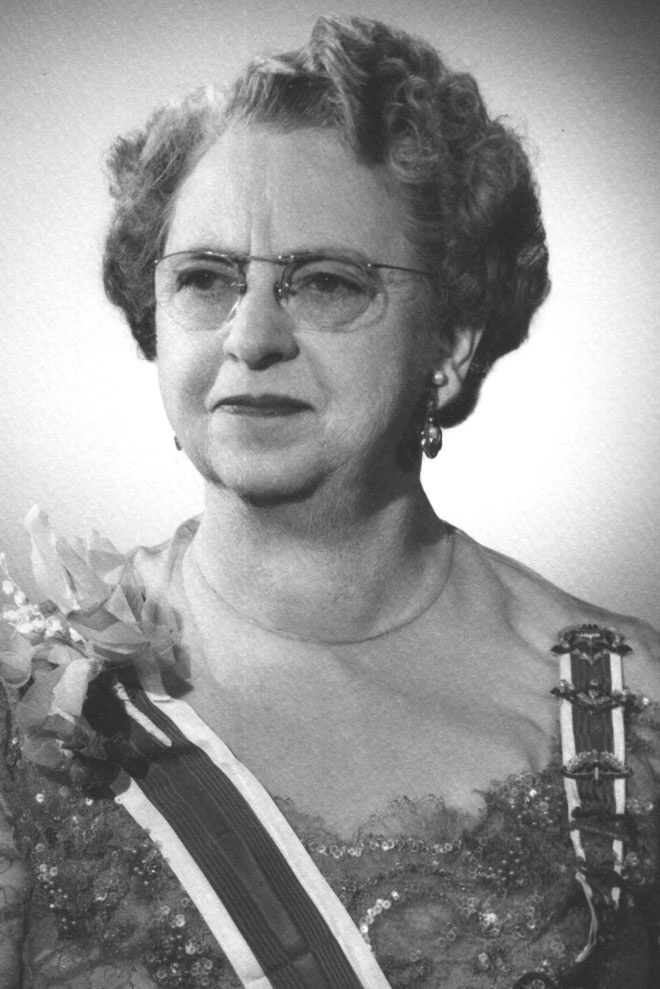
Emily Gibson Braerton

Grace Lincoln Hall Brosseau

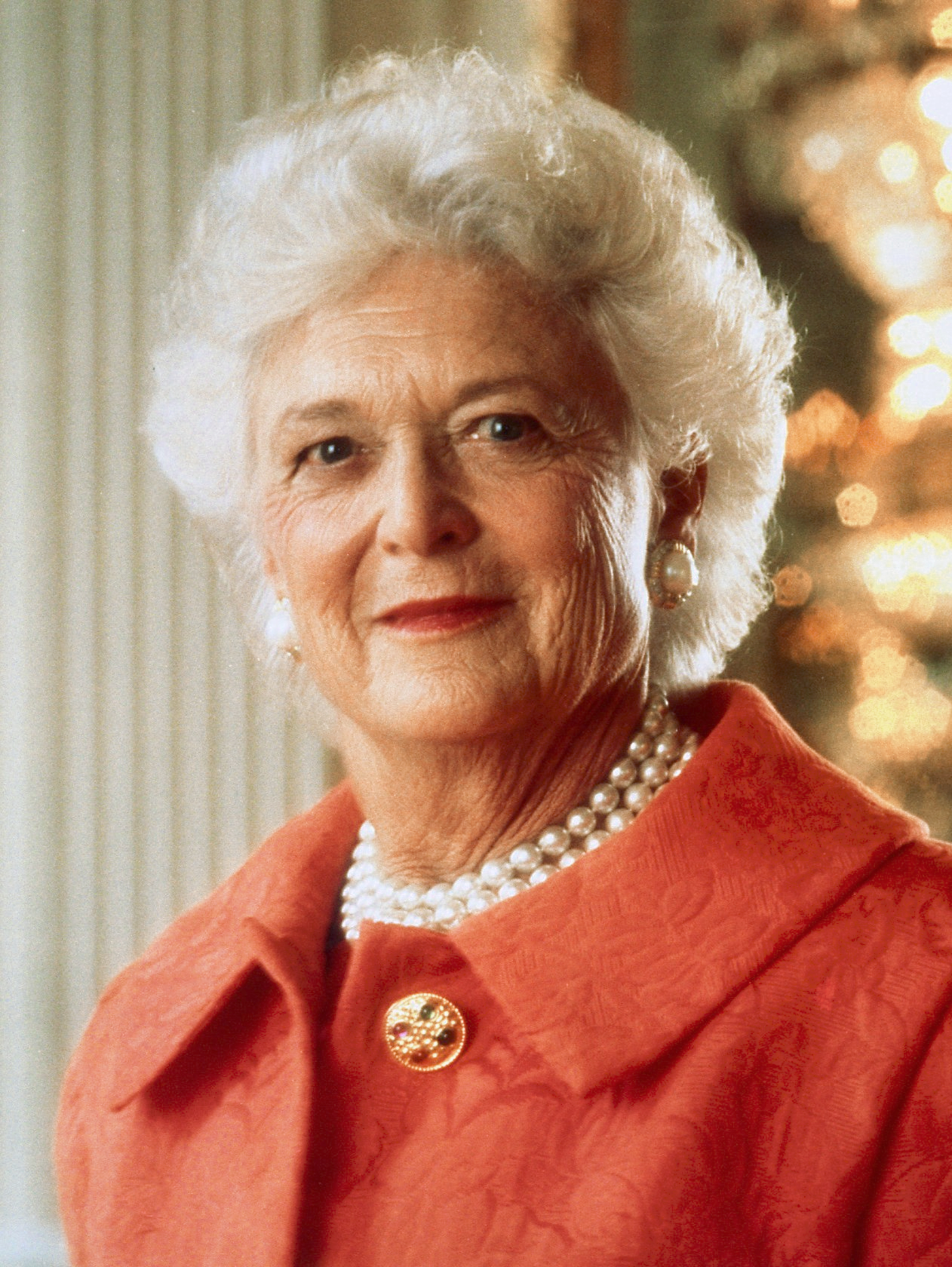
Barbara Bush

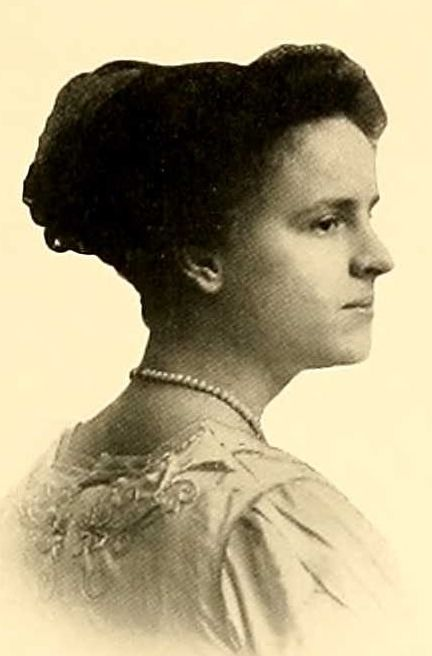
Ruth Coltrane Cannon

Princess Julia Grant Cantacuzène, Countess Speransky

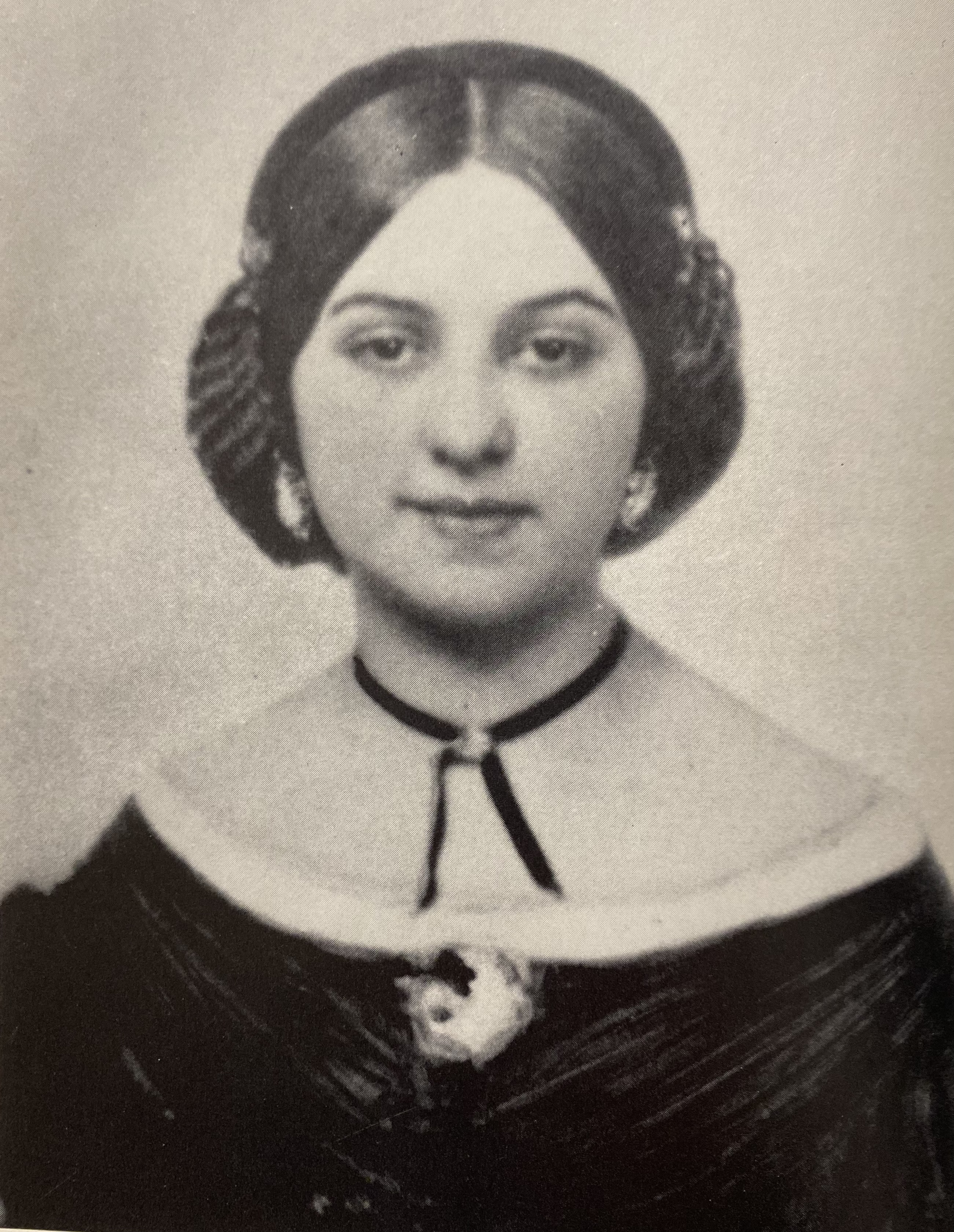
Eleanor Kearny Carr

Rosalynn Carter

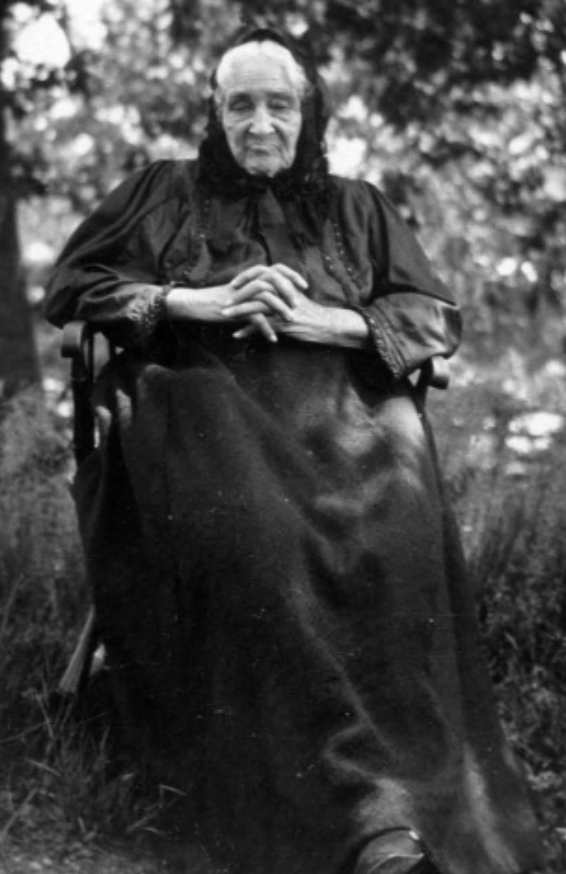
Eunice Davis

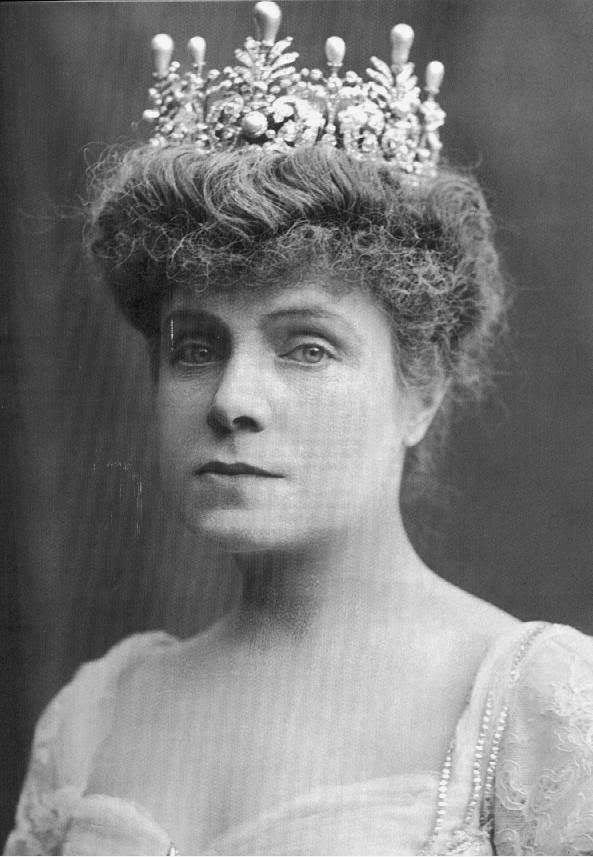
Infanta Eulalia, Duchess of Galliera

Cornelia Cole Fairbanks

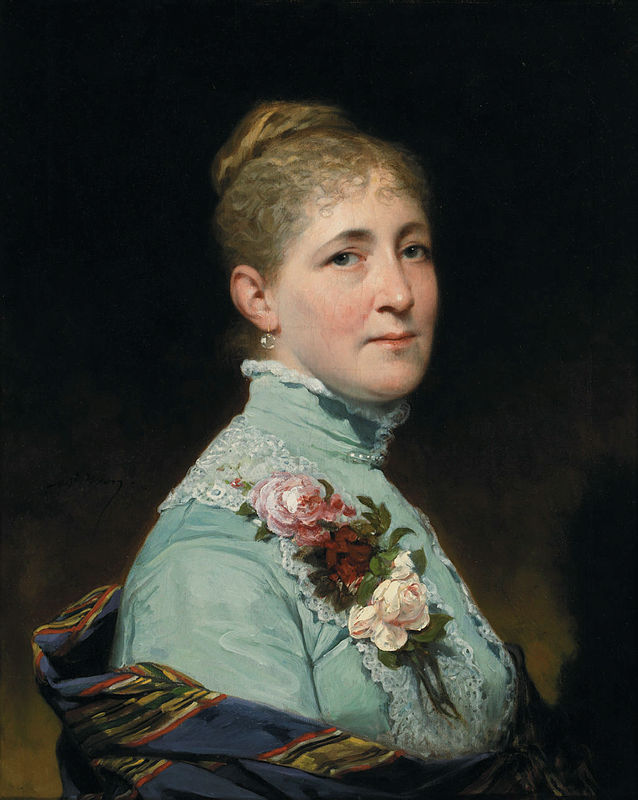
Caroline Scott Harrison

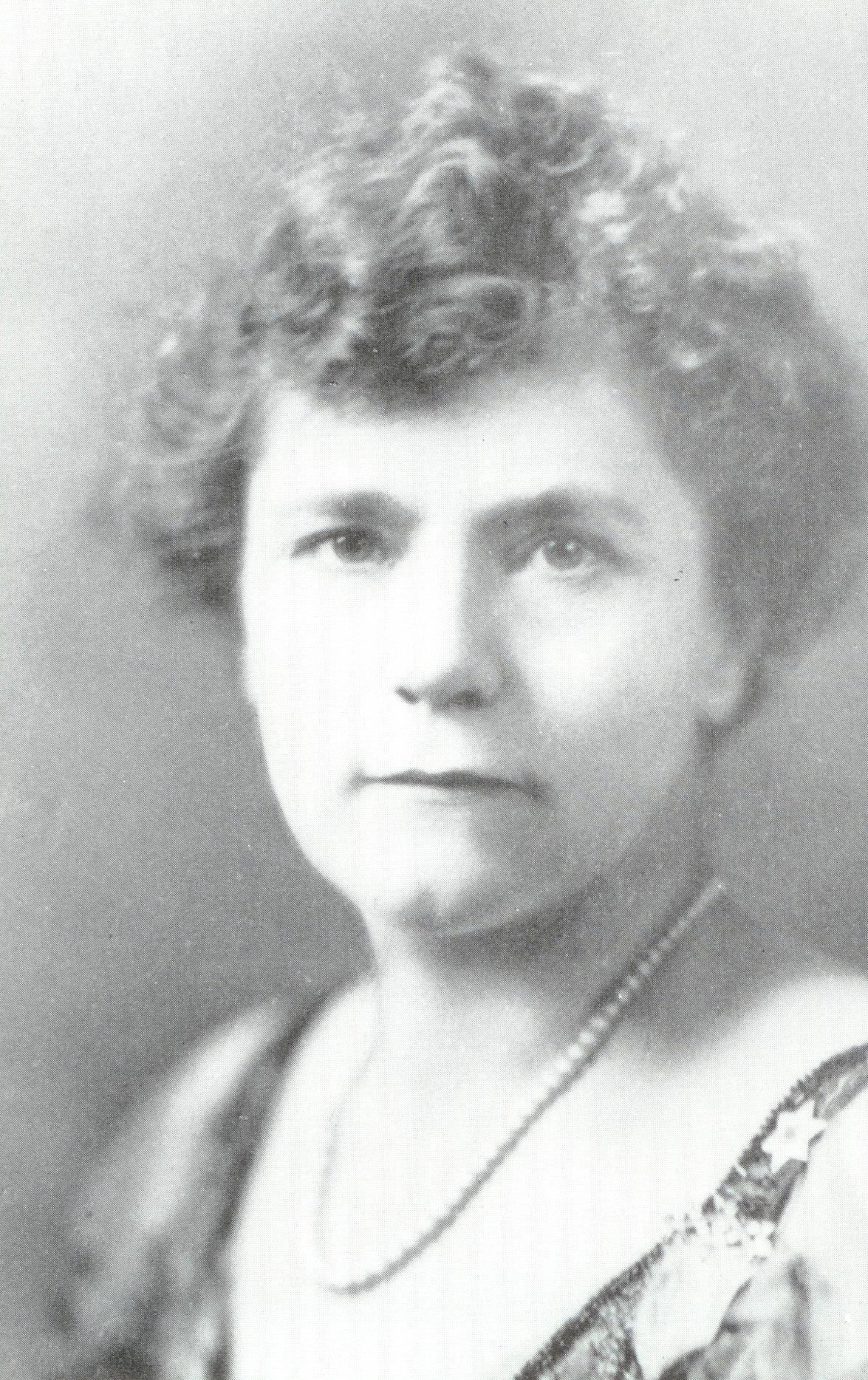
Sallie Foster Harshbarger

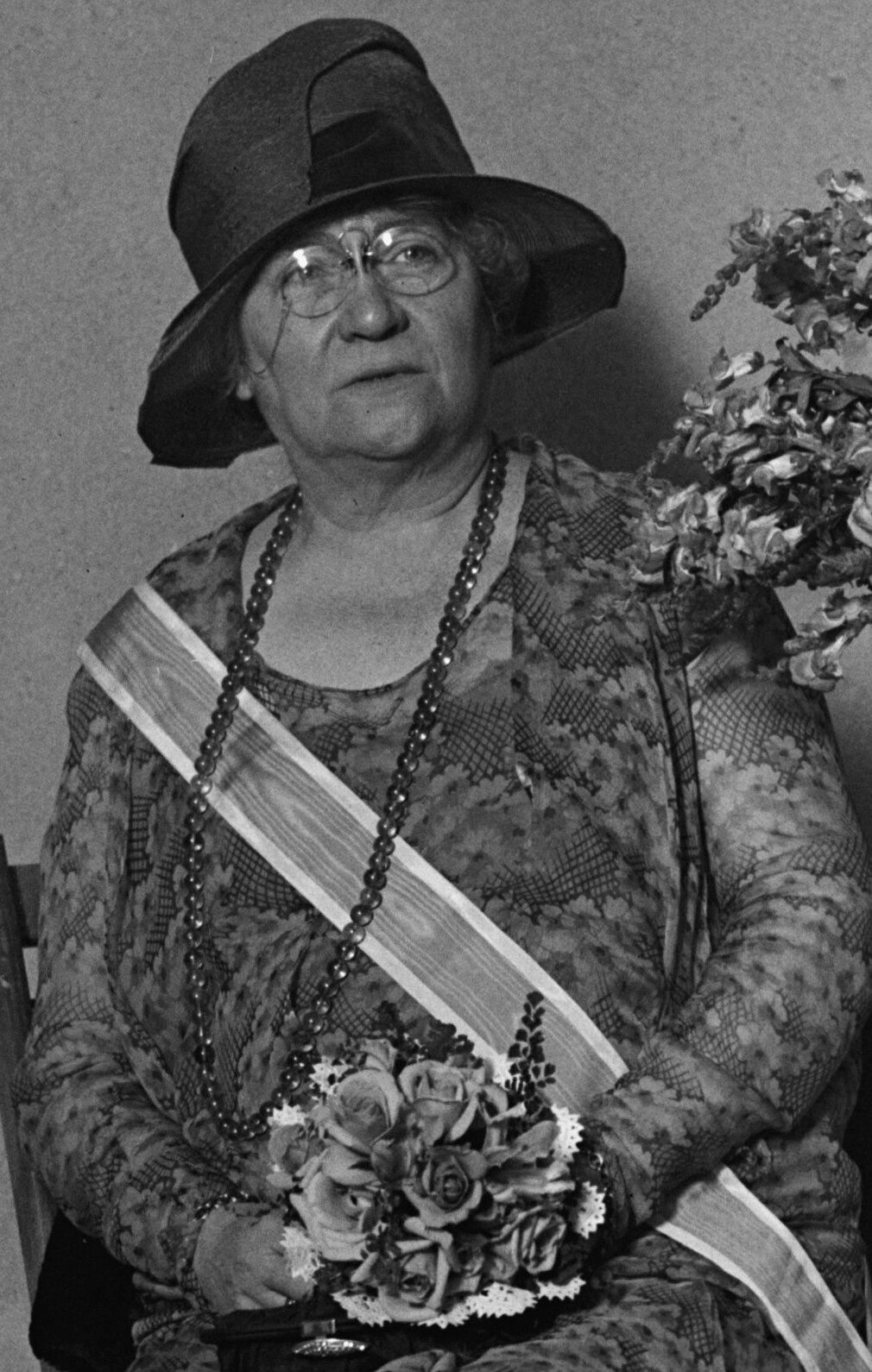
Edith Irwin Hobart

Grace Hopper

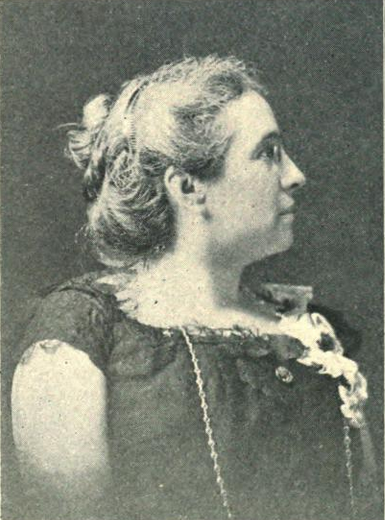
Harriet Lane Huntress

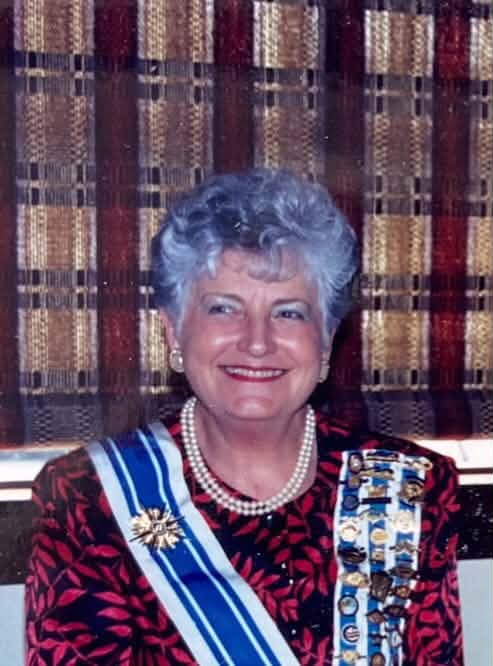
Dorla Eaton Kemper

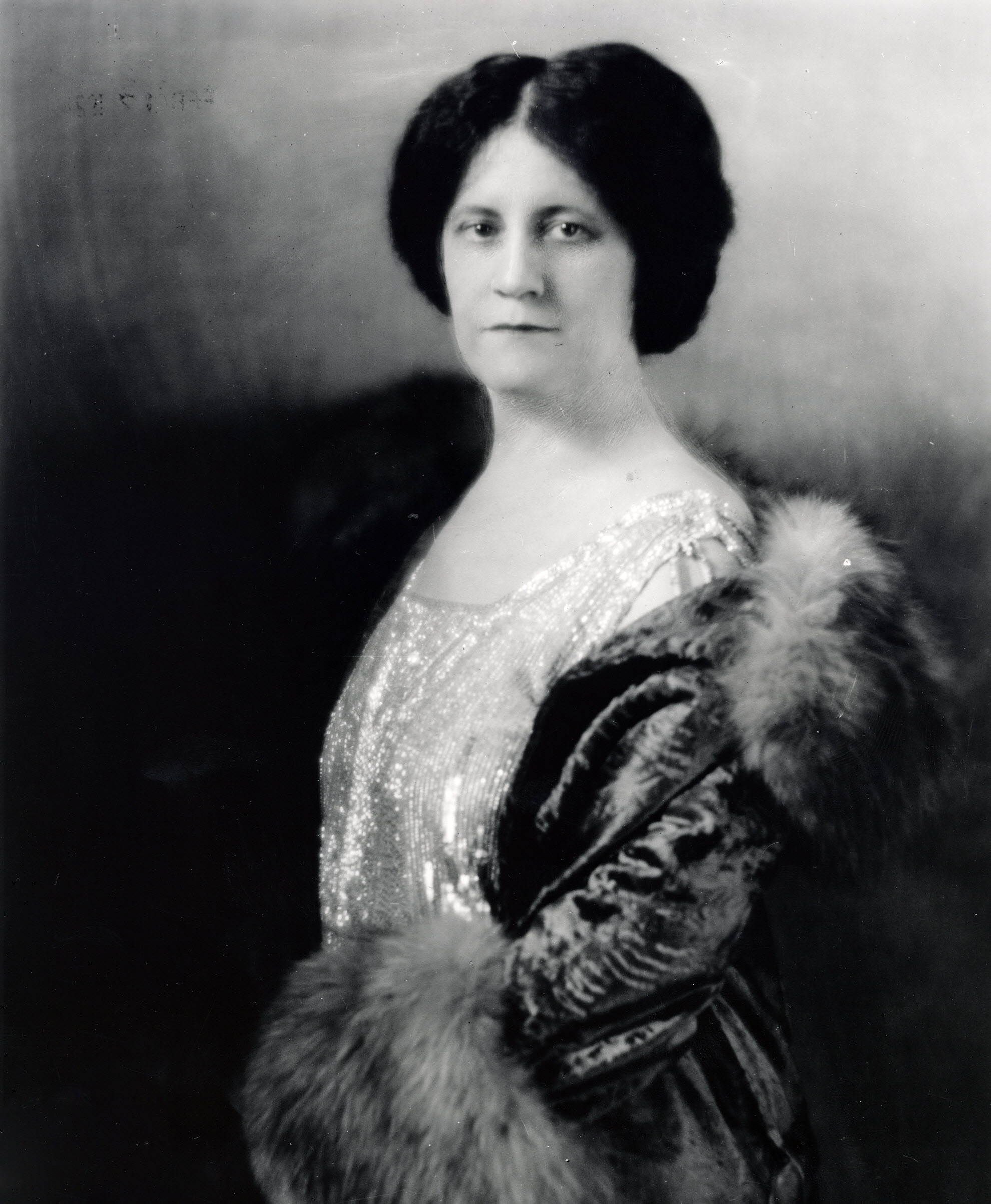
Katherine Gudger Langley

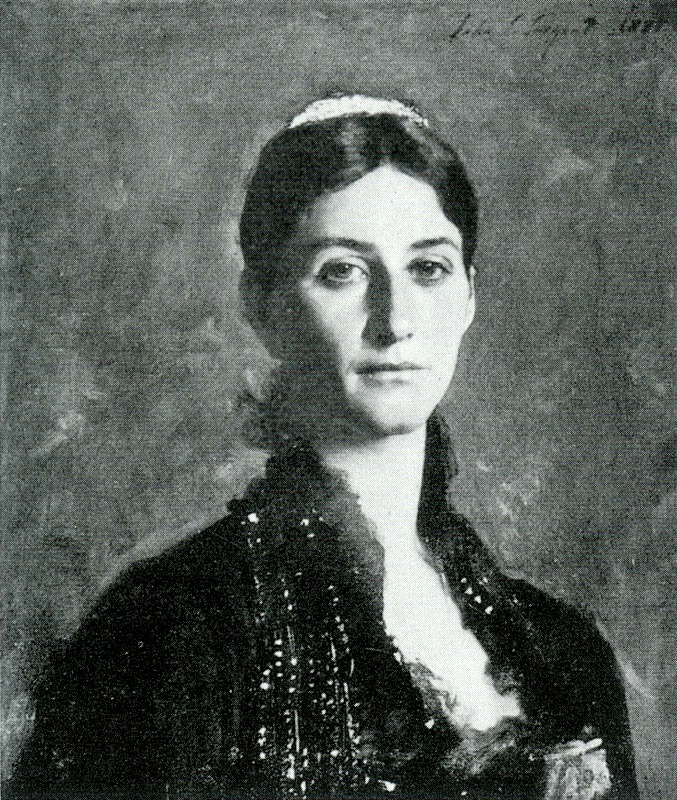
Mary V. Tingley Lawrence

Mary Smith Lockwood

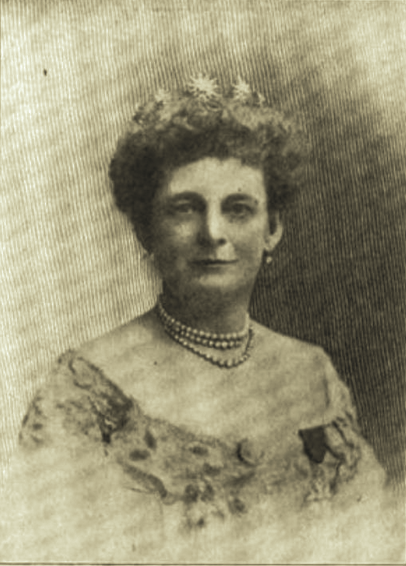
Mary Fryer Manning

Anita Newcomb McGee

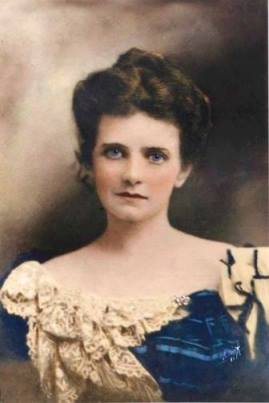
Cornelia Alice Norris

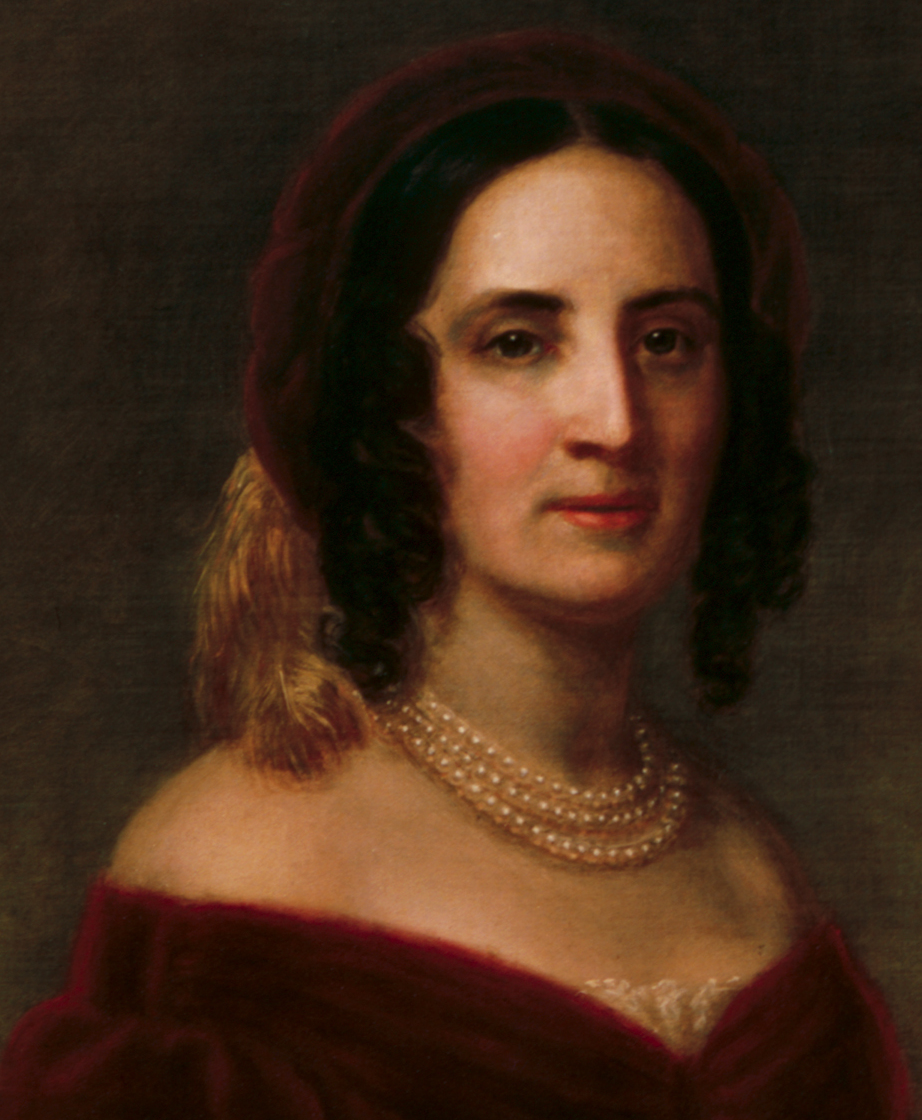
Sarah Childress Polk

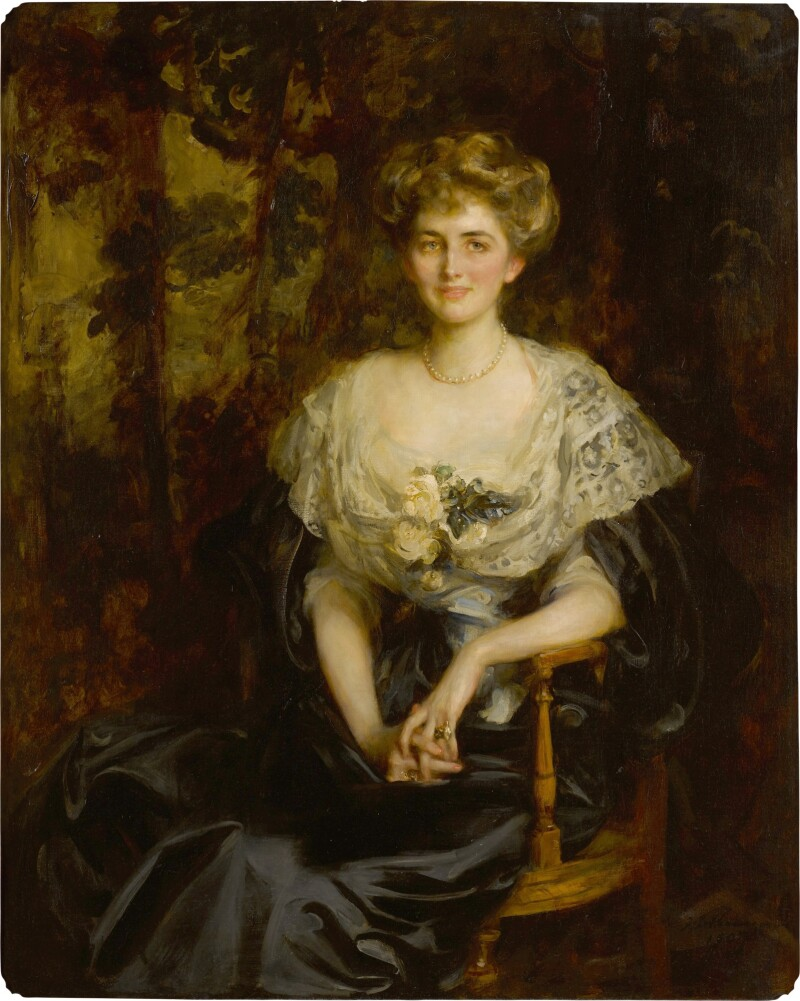
Marjorie Merriweather Post

Ginger Rogers

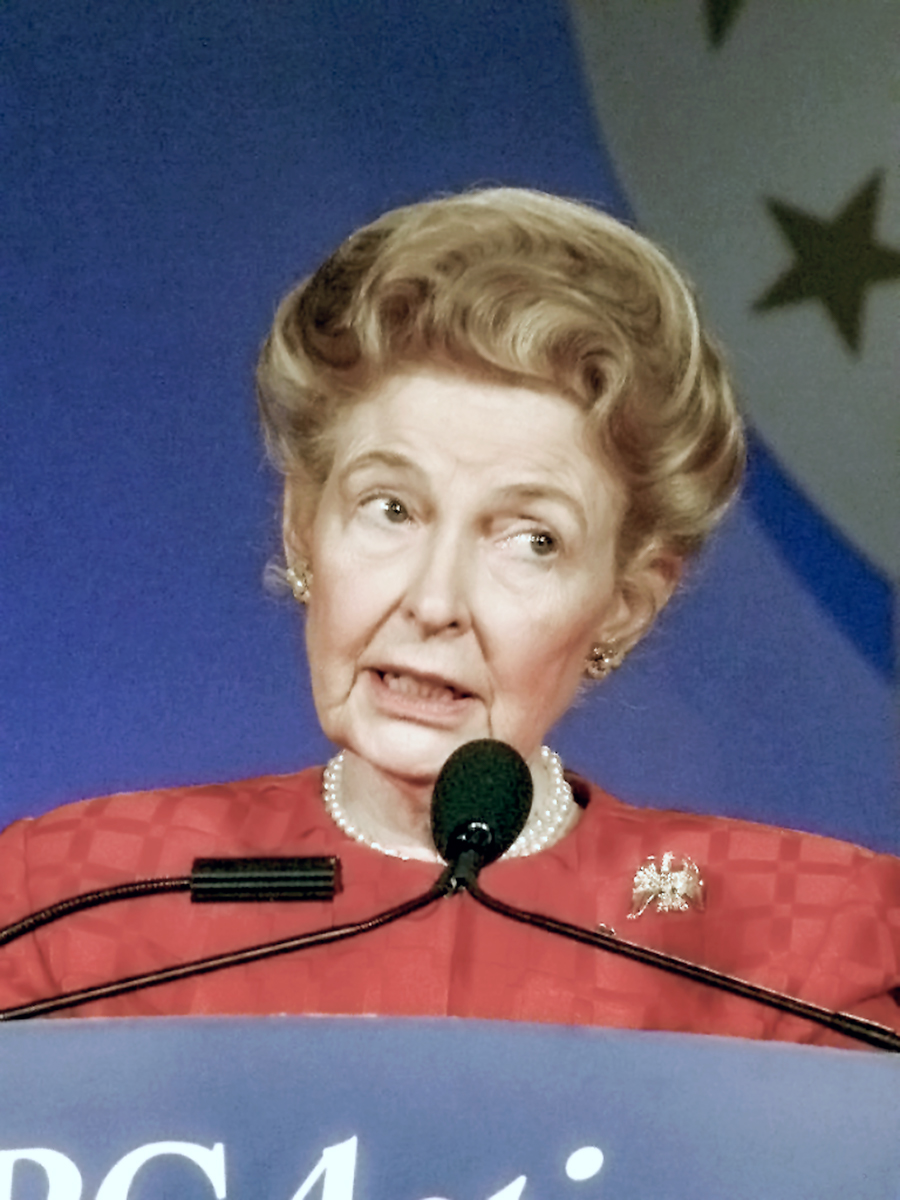
Phyllis Schlafly

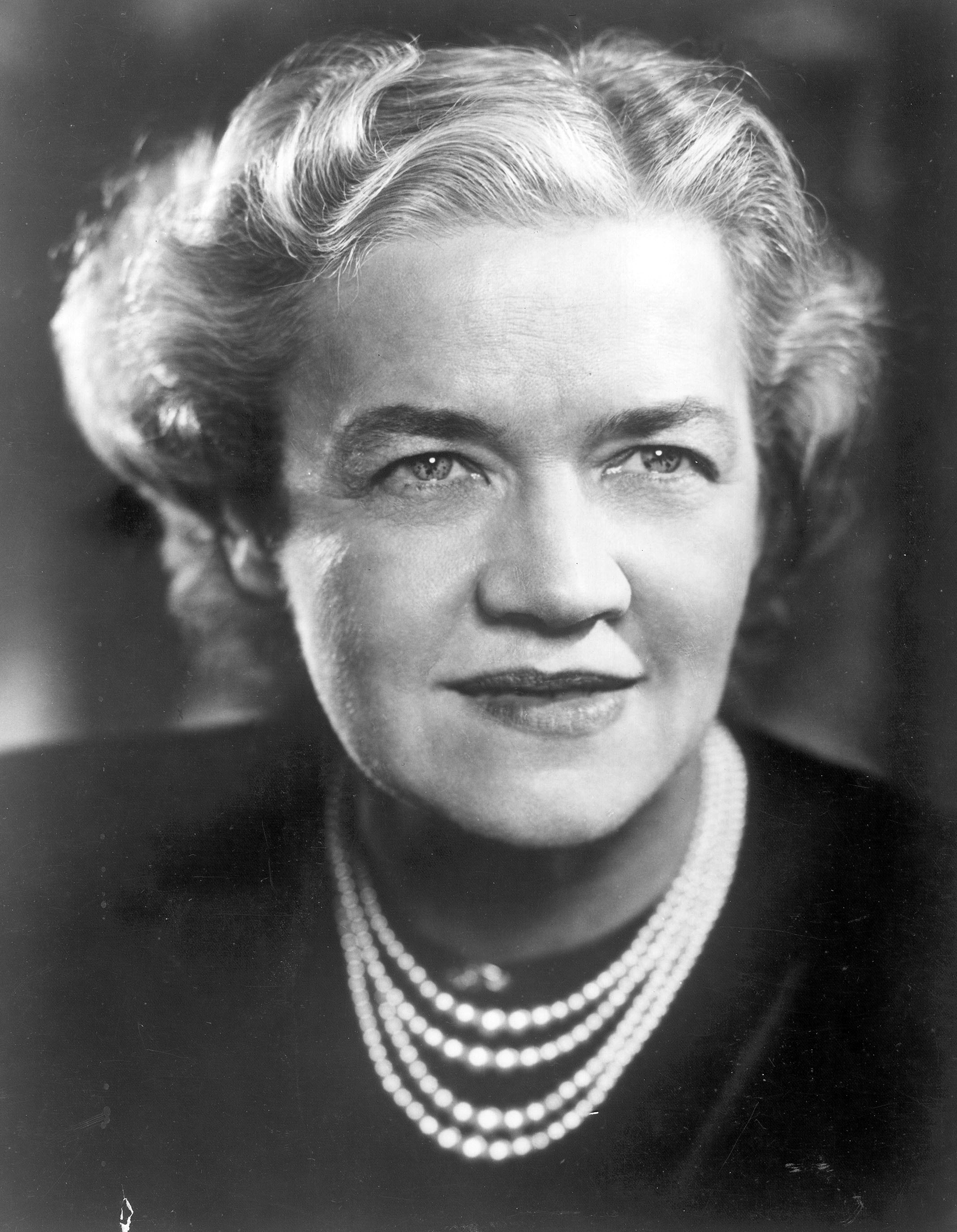
Margaret Chase Smith

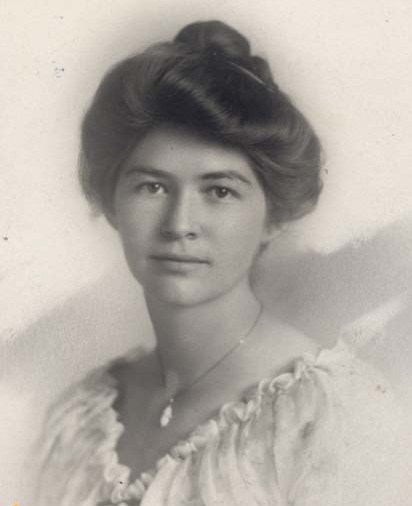
Agnes Wright Spring

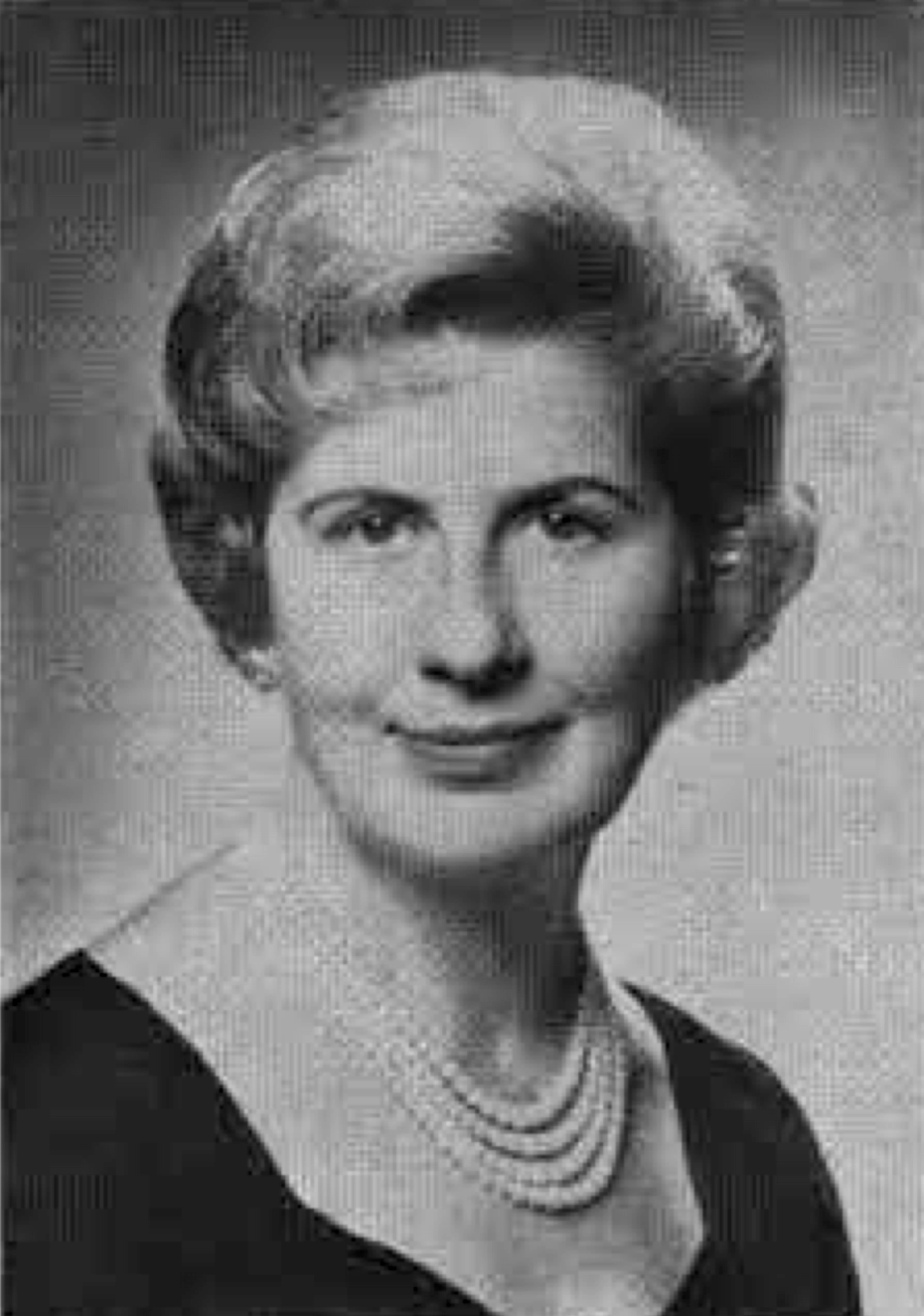
Adele Woodhouse Erb Sullivan

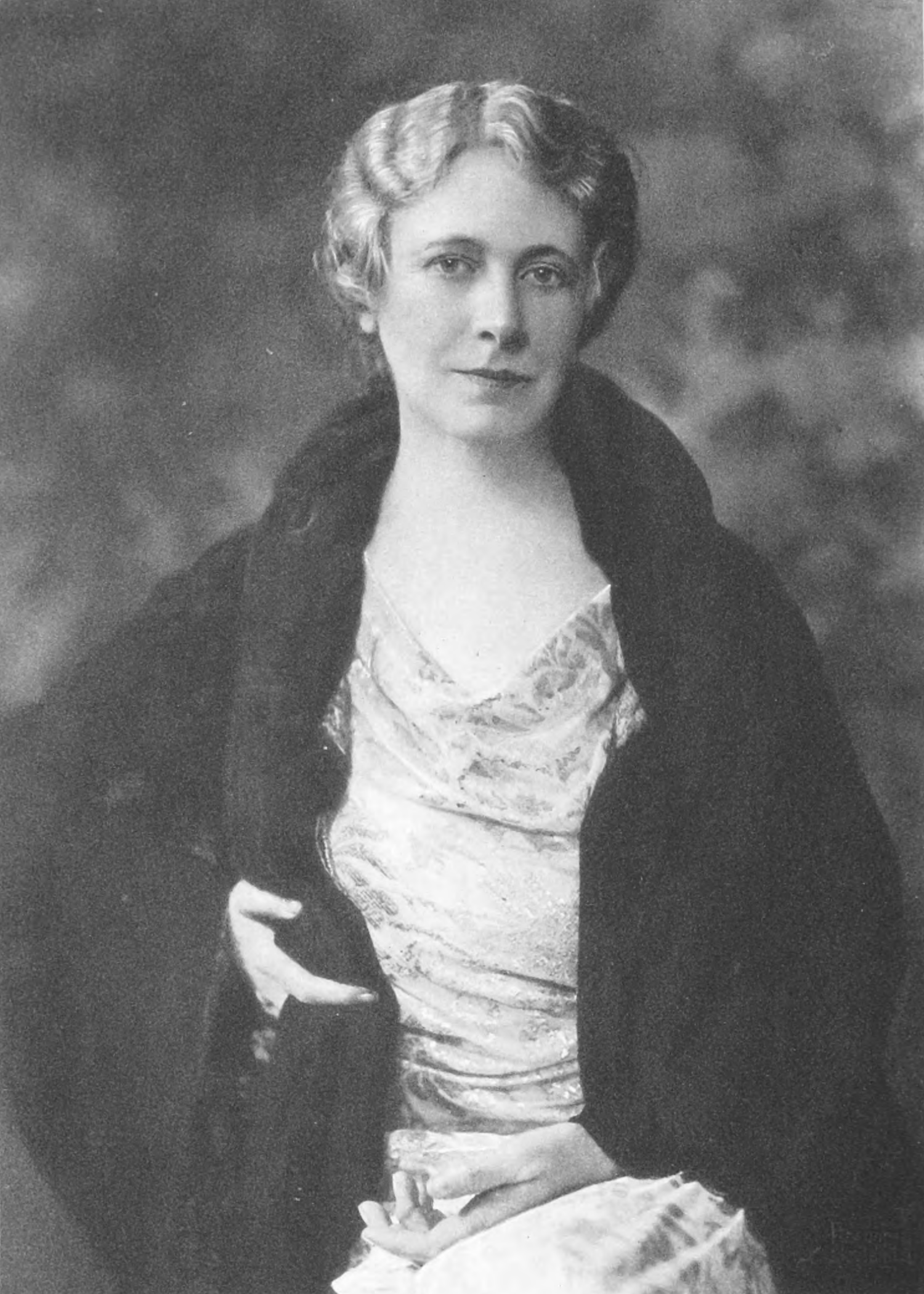
May Erwin Talmadge

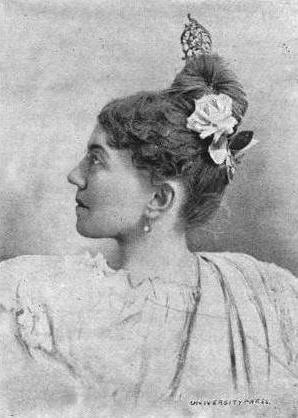
Mary Boyce Temple

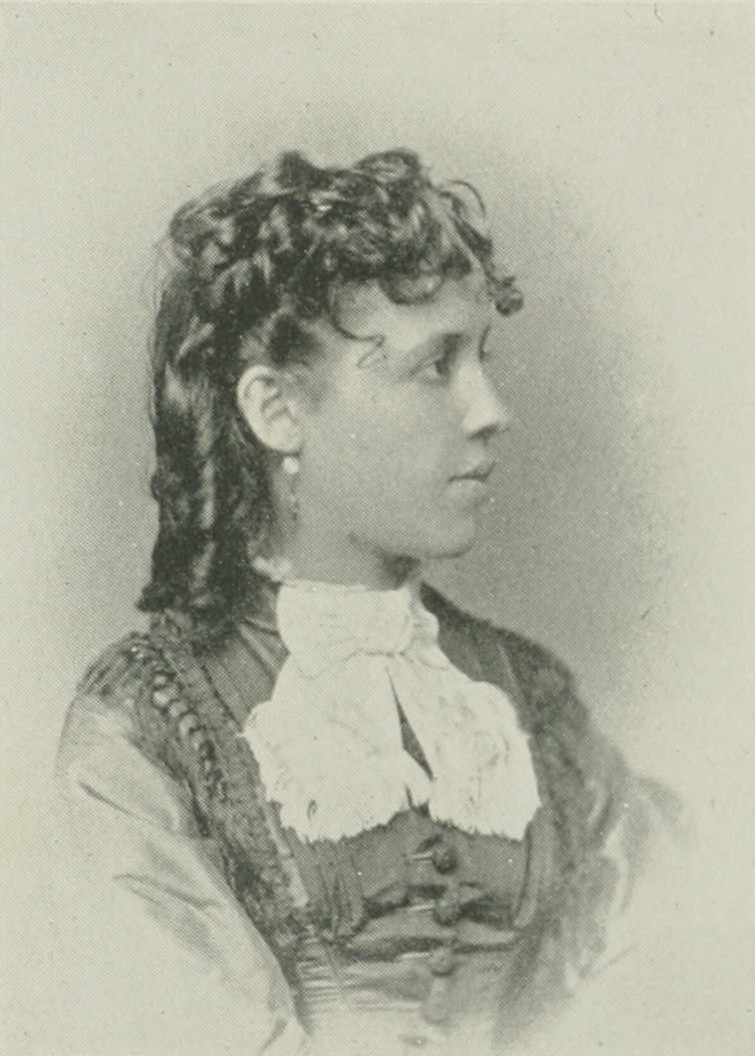
Martha Poland Thurston

Gertrude Vanderbilt Whitney

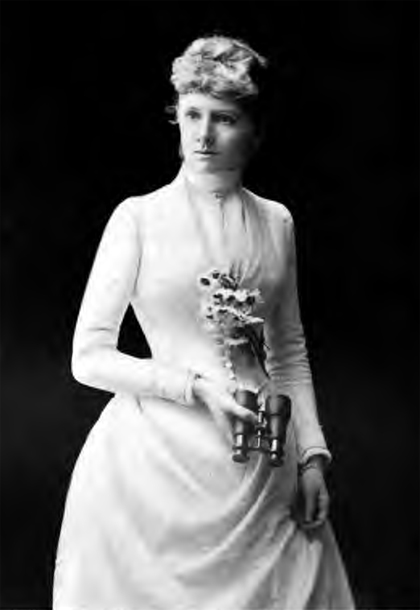
Reubena Hyde Walworth

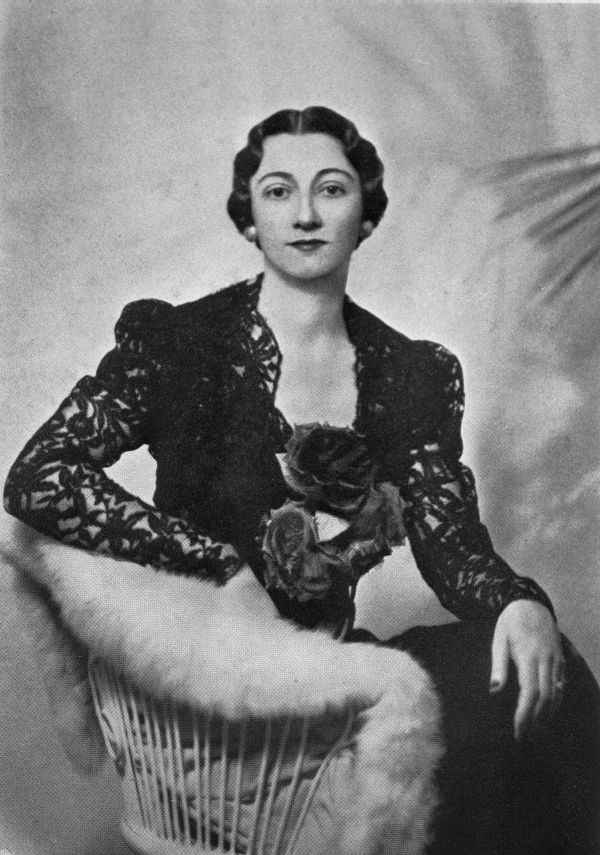
Kathryn Slaughter Wittichen

- Jane Addams (1860–1935), activist and Nobel Peace Prize winner
- Alice Baltzelle Addenbrooke (1881–1972), historian and clubwoman
- Mary Jane Aldrich (1833–1909), temperance reformer and lecturer
- Annie Lowrie Alexander (1864–1929), physician
- Julia McGehee Alexander (1876–1957), politician and lawyer
- Susan B. Anthony (1820–1906), suffragist
- Elizabeth Cody Bachman (1898–1985), President General of the United Daughters of the Confederacy
- Helen Tufts Bailie (1874–1962), social reformer and activist
- Lillie Stella Acer Ballagh (1857–1938), national chairman of Colonial Relics
- Betty Ballinger (1854–1936), co-founder of the Daughters of the Republic of Texas
- Mary Ross Banks (1846–1910), litterateur and author
- Sarah Gertrude Banks (1839–1926), physician and suffragist
- Clara Barton (1821–1912), American Red Cross founder
- Octavia Williams Bates (1846–1911), suffragist, clubwoman, author
- Mary Temple Bayard (1853–1916), American writer, journalist
- Jeannette Osborn Baylies (1912–1984), 31st DAR President General
- Cora M. Beach (1878–1968), State Chairman and member of National Committee for Genealogical and Historical Research
- Clara Bancroft Beatley (1858–1923), educator, lecturer, author
- Florence Hague Becker (1886–1971), philanthropist, anti-communist, and 16th NSDAR President General'
- Jessie Van Zile Belden (1857–1910), novelist and former State Regent of New York
- Claudia Belk (1937–2017), judge and First Lady of Charlotte, North Carolina
- Jennie Iowa Berry (1866–1951), National President, Woman's Relief Corps
- Martha Berry (1865–1942), educator and founder of Berry College
- Fanny Yarborough Bickett (1870–1941), First Lady of North Carolina and first female president of the North Carolina Railroad
- Ella A. Bigelow (1849–1917), author and clubwoman
- Wayne Garrison Blair (1930–2000), 36th DAR President General
- Angie Elizabeth Burt Bowden (1860–1952), writer and Washington DAR State Regent
- Leah Belle Kepner Boyce (1881–1960), State Recording and secretary of the California Daughters of the American Revolution
- Mary Eleanor Brackenridge (1837–1924), suffragist, clubwoman, and academic administrator
- Gene Bradford (1909–1937), member of the Washington State House of Representatives
- Emily Gibson Braerton (1884–1966), activist and NSDAR Vice President General
- Grace Lincoln Hall Brosseau (1872–1959), writer, socialite, and 13th NSDAR President General
- Alice Willson Broughton (1889–1980), First Lady of North Carolina
- Elizabeth Childress Brown (1842–1919), First Lady of Tennessee and President General of the United Daughters of the Confederacy
- Olivia Dudley Bucknam (1874–1966), clubwoman
- Febb Burn (1873–1945), schoolteacher and suffragist
- Frances E. Burns (1866–1937), social leader, business executive
- Barbara Bush (1925–2018), former first lady of the United States
- Mary Virginia Ellet Cabell (1839–1930), DAR Vice President-Presiding
- Helen Calkins (1893–1970), American mathematician
- Ruth Coltrane Cannon (1891–1965), preservationist, historian, and philanthropist
- Princess Julia Cantacuzène, Countess Speransky (1876–1975), American-Russian aristocrat and author, granddaughter of President Ulysses S. Grant
- Eleanor Kearny Carr (1840–1912), First Lady of North Carolina
- Gertrude Sprague Carraway (1896–1993), journalist, educator, and 22nd NSDAR President General
- Margaret Ann Scruggs Carruth (1892–1988), etcher, printmaker, illustrator and educator
- Rosalynn Carter (1927–2023), former first lady of the United States, politician, political and social activist
- Luella J. B. Case (1807–1857), author
- Marietta Stanley Case (1845–1900), poet and temperance advocate
- Mary C. Martin Casey (died 1920), socialite
- Emma Plummer Chadwick (1863–1962), Head of the Order of the Eastern Star, co-designer of the Flag of Washington
- Mildred Stafford Cherry (1894–1971), First Lady of North Carolina
- Annetta R. Chipp (1866–1961), temperance leader and prison evangelist
- Florence Anderson Clark (1835–1918), author, newspaper editor, librarian, university dean
- Vinnie B. Clark (1878–1971), established and developed the Geography Department at the San Diego State Teachers College
- Ruth Dickinson Clement (1873–1953), politician and designer of the first Flag of Oklahoma
- Alice Culler Cobb (1843-1918), educator, missionary
- Clara Rankin Coblentz (1863–1933), social reformer
- Sarah Johnson Cocke (1865–1944), writer and civic leader
- Margaret Wootten Collier (1869–1947), author
- Martha Layne Collins (1936–2025), Governor of Kentucky
- Emily Parmely Collins (1814–1909) – suffragist, activist, writer
- Lora Haines Cook (1866–1946), 12th NSDAR President General
- Betty Cordon (1923–2012) – socialite, dubbed "New York's Glamour Girl" in 1941 and "America's No.1 Debutante" in 1942
- Elizabeth Brownrigg Henderson Cotten (1875–1975), socialite, suffragist, and librarian
- Charity Rusk Craig (1849–1913) – sixth national president of the Woman's Relief Corps
- Lura Harris Craighead (1858–1926) – author, parliamentarian, clubwoman
- Harriet L. Cramer (1847–1922) – newspaper publisher
- Mary Rankin Cranston (1873-1931) – librarian, non-fiction writer, social researcher, and farmer
- Inez Mabel Crawford (1869–1938), first registrar of the General Edward Hand Chapter
- Alice Creelman (1858–1952), artist and art dealer
- Mary Mayo Crenshaw (1875–1951), author and civil servant
- Pauline Smith Crenshaw (1878–1956), historian, co-founder and president of the Montgomery Museum of Fine Arts, Regent of the Frances Marion Chapter, NSDAR
- Ethel Sperry Crocker (1861–1934), philanthropist and art patron
- Emma Guy Cromwell (1865–1952), Kentucky State Treasurer and Kentucky Secretary of State
- Belle Caldwell Culbertson (1857–1934), author and philanthropist
- Susan Lawrence Dana (1862–1946), suffragist, philanthropist, heiress, and socialite
- Addie Worth Bagley Daniels (1869–1943), suffragist, writer, and socialite
- Flora Adams Darling (1840–1910), founder of the National Society of United States Daughters of 1812 and the General Society Daughters of the Revolution 1776
- Eunice Davis (1800–1901), abolitionist and founding member of the Boston Female Anti-Slavery Society
- Carrie Chase Davis (1863–1953), American physician, suffragist
- Kate Embry Dowdle Davis (1871–1954), President National of the U.S. Daughters of 1812
- Rachel Darden Davis (1905–1979), physician and member of the North Carolina House of Representatives
- Susan Topliff Davis (1862–1931), American non-profit executive
- Marie Decca (1859–unknown), American lyric soprano operatic singer
- Helen Reed de Laporte (1864–1936), educator and politician, first woman to serve on a school board in Dutchess County, New York
- Margaret B. Denning (1856–1935), missionary and temperance worker
- Mary Desha (1850–1911), educator, civil servant, and co-founder of the DAR
- Allie Luse Dick (1859–1933), music teacher
- Anne Alexander Dickey (1843–1940), clubwoman and co-founder of the Daughters of Hawaii
- Estelle Skidmore Doremus (1830–1905), supporter of the New York Philharmonic
- Ella Loraine Dorsey (1853–1935), author, journalist, translator
- Elizabeth Caroline Dowdell (1829–1909), ideator, Woman's Missionary Society of the Methodist Episcopal Church, South
- Fanny Murdaugh Downing (1831–1894), author and poet
- Marion Davison Duffie (1896–1965), singer and voice teacher
- Saidie Orr Dunbar (1880–1960), Executive Secretary of the Oregon Tuberculosis Association
- Marion Moncure Duncan (1913–1978), businesswoman and 25th NSDAR President General
- Caroline B. Eager (1862–1929), American philanthropist who worked mainly with the Igorot people of the Philippine Islands
- Alice Morse Earle (1851–1911), historian and writer
- Ida Horton East (1842–1915), philanthropist
- Mary Baker Eddy (1821–1910), founder of Christian Science church
- Mary Elvira Elliott (1851–1942), writer and lecturer
- Isabel H. Ellis (1881–1962), clubwoman
- Margaret Dye Ellis (1845–1925), social reformer and lobbyist
- Mary McKinley Daves Ellis (1835–1916), First Lady of North Carolina
- Anne Corinne Colburn Ellison (died 1946), founder of the Daughters of Colonial Wars, DAR Librarian General, Massachusetts DAR State Regent
- Lelia Dromgold Emig (1872–1957), genealogist
- Infanta Eulalia, Duchess of Galliera (1864–1958), Spanish princess and author
- Cornelia Cole Fairbanks (1852–1913), Second Lady of the United States, 6th NSDAR President General
- Clara Elizabeth Fanning (1878–1938), editor and compiler
- Rebecca Latimer Felton (1835–1930), U.S. Senator from Georgia
- Lena Santos Ferguson (1928–2004), secretary and second African American member of the DAR
- Laura Dayton Fessenden (1852–1924), author
- Ann Davison Duffie Fleck (1923–2018), 34th DAR President General
- Inglis Fletcher (1879–1969), American writer
- Louise Fluke (1900–1986), art teacher and designer of the Flag of Oklahoma
- Mary Alice Fonda (1837–1897), American musician, linguist, author, critic
- Dorothy Ayer Gardner Ford (1892–1967), mother of U.S. President Gerald Ford
- Mary Parke Foster (1840–1922), 3rd NSDAR President General
- Abigail Keasey Frankel (died 1931), prominent club and civic worker of Portland. She was the first president of the Oregon Federation of Business and Professional Women
- Emma Blood French (1853–1932), philanthropist
- Agnes Moore Fryberger (1868–1939), music educator
- Sarah E. Fuller (1838–1913), philanthropist and social leader
- Sarah Ewing Sims Carter Gaut (1826–1912), socialite and Confederate spy
- Dale Pickett Gay (1891–1988), Wyoming clubwoman and one of the best known women of her time in the oil business
- Dixie Cornell Gebhardt (1866–1955), Iowa DAR State Regent and designer of the Flag of Iowa
- Grace Gemberling (1903–1997), painter
- Wilma Anderson Gilman (1881–1971), concert pianist, music teacher, clubwoman
- Lillian Gish (1893–1993), actress
- Fannie Smith Goble (1861–1940), held several high offices in Daughters of the American Revolution organization
- Sarah Ford Judd Goode (1854–1921), charter member of the DAR
- Isophene Goodin Bailhache, national vice chairman of Historic Spots, State Officer, Chapter Regent
- Gene Grabeel (1920–2015), mathematician and cryptanalyst who founded the Venona project
- Julia Grant (1826–1902), First Lady of the United States
- Allene Wilson Groves (1896–1986), 23rd DAR President General
- Sarah Elizabeth Mitchell Guernsey (1860–1939), educator, philanthropist, and 10th NSDAR President General
- Harriet A. Haas (1874–1958), attorney and member of Piedmont Board of Education
- Alice Rogers Hager (1894–1969), writer, journalist, and traveler
- Sarah C. Hall (1832–1926), physician, suffragist
- Anna Sanborn Hamilton (1848–1927), co-founder, president, League of American Pen Women
- Emma Stark Hampton (1843–1925), fifth National President, Woman's Relief Corps
- Sarah Bond Hanley (1865–1959), first Democratic woman to serve in the Illinois House of Representatives. She served as the Illinois State Regent.
- Inez M. Haring (1875–1968), American botanist
- Mildred Harnack (1902–1943), historian, translator, and member of the German Resistance
- Kate Stevens Harpel (1867–1950), teacher, physician
- Ethel Hillyer Harris (1859–1931), author
- Sallie Foster Harshbarger (1874–1958), from 1920 to 1922, State Regent of the Daughters of the American Revolution
- Caroline Harrison (1832– 1892), former first lady of the United States
- Antoinette Arnold Hawley (1842–1919), president, Colorado WCTU
- L. Isabel Heald (1842–1932), social leader and philanthropic worker
- Grace Raymond Hebard (1861–1936), historian, scholar, suffragist, and economist
- Mary Ferrand Henderson (1887–1965), suffragist and Democratic party leader
- Mary Hilliard Hinton (1869–1961), historian, painter, anti-suffragist, pro-racial segregation
- Edith Irwin Hobart (1869–1958), 14th NSDAR President General
- Willie Kavanaugh Hocker (1862–1944), schoolteacher and designer of the Flag of Arkansas
- Emily Caroline Chandler Hodgin (1838–1907), temperance reformer
- Margaret Gardner Hoey (1875–1942), First Lady of North Carolina
- Ella Virginia Houck Holloway (1862–1940), President National of the U.S. Daughters of 1812, later resigned from DAR
- Grace Hopper (1906–1992), rear admiral, USNR
- Anna Morris Holstein (1825–1900), Founder First Regent D.A.R. Valley Forge Chapter, Hosted 1891 DAR National Leadership visit to Valley Forge, Prayer Desk Dedicated at VF Memorial Chapel in her honor, Founder, Regent Centennial and Memorial Association, Civil War Nurse, Author.
- Harriet Lane Huntress (1860–1922), Deputy Superintendent Public Instruction in New Hampshire
- Mary Anna Jackson (1831–1915), wife of Confederate General Stonewall Jackson
- Ida Sherman Jenne (1860–1934), President National of the U.S. Daughters of 1812
- Birdie Robertson Johnson (1868–1926), suffragist and clubwoman
- Electa Amanda Wright Johnson (1938–1929), philanthropist, writer
- Calista Robinson Jones (1839-1913), National President of the Woman's Relief Corps
- Cornelia Hall Jones (1842–1911), philanthropist and co-founder of the Daughters of Hawaii
- Sara Roddis Jones (1909–1975), 29th DAR President General
- Rebecca Richardson Joslin (1846–1934), writer, lecturer, benefactor, clubwoman
- Jennie Murray Kemp (1858–1928), temperance leader and writer
- Dorla Eaton Kemper (1929–2025), 37th NSDAR President General
- Sara Beaumont Kennedy (1859–1920), writer and newspaper editor
- Esther Augusta Howard King (1845–1925), clubwoman
- Sarah McKelley King (1921–2013), 33rd DAR President General
- Katherine G. Langley (1888–1948), politician, U.S. congresswoman
- Mary Lewis Langworthy (1872–1949), teacher, writer, lecturer, and executive
- Anna Matilda Larrabee (1842–1931), First Lady of Iowa
- Harriet Nisbet Latta (1853–1910), Founding State Regent of North Carolina
- Ella Park Lawrence (1857–1924), State Regent of Illinois, responsible for the creation of the Flag of Illinois
- Mary V. Tingley Lawrence (ca. 1840 – 1931), writer and customs inspector
- Nancy A. Leatherwood (1872–1961), national chairman of Historical and Literary Reciprocity Committee of the Daughters of the American Revolution
- Willie Kirkpatrick Lindsay (1875–1954), educator and temperance activist
- Mary Smith Lockwood (1831–1922), suffragist, writer, and co-founder of the DAR
- Colonel Westray Battle Long (1901–1972), director of the Women's Army Corps
- Harriett Lothrop (1844–1924), author and founder of the Children of the American Revolution
- Anne Bozeman Lyon (1860–1936), writer
- Edith Bolte MacCracken (1869–1946), State Regent of the Daughters of the American Revolution
- Mary Stuart James MacMurphy (1846–1934), teacher, lecturer, clubwoman, and author
- Edith Scott Magna (1885–1960), 15th NSDAR President General
- Mary Fryer Manning (1844–1928), 5th NSDAR President General and U.S. Commissioner to the Exposition Universelle
- Virginia Donaghe McClurg (1857–1931), member
- Ruth Karr McKee (1874–1951), member
- Mary Martha Presley Merritt (died 1994), politician
- Moina Michael (1869–1944), educator and originator of Memorial Day Poppies
- Anne Hazen McFarland (1868–1930), M.D., physician and medical journal editor
- Anita Newcomb McGee (1864–1940), founder of the DAR Hospital Corps and the Army Nurse Corps
- May Faris McKinney (1874–1959), president-general of the United Daughters of the Confederacy
- Emily Nelson Ritchie McLean (1859–1916), 7th NSDAR President General
- Virginia Faulkner McSherry (1845–1916), president-general of the United Daughters of the Confederacy
- Luella F. McWhirter (1859–1952), president, Indiana State Woman's Christian Temperance Union
- Mary E. Metzgar (1849–1919), temperance activist
- Anne Rogers Minor (1864–1947), artist and 11th NSDAR President General, 1920–1923
- Fanny E. Minot (1847–1919), national president Woman's Relief Corps
- Jeannie Blackburn Moran (1842/50–1929), author, community leader, socialite, and philanthropist; charter member, DAR
- Lucy Leavenworth Wilder Morris (1865–1935), historian and teacher
- Ella Henrietta Davidson Morrison (1851–1939), North Carolina DAR State Regent
- Bessie Morse (1869–1948), founder of The Morse School of Expression, St. Louis
- Sara E. Morse (1871–1933), held positions in several organizations
- Grandma Moses (1860–1961), folk artist
- Alice Curtice Moyer (1866–1937), writer and suffragist
- Katie Cabell Currie Muse (1861–1927), President General of the United Daughters of the Confederacy
- Mary Louise Nash (1826–1896), educator and writer
- Emma Huntington Nason (1845–1921), poet, author, and musical composer
- Alice Josephine Tye Noel (1868–1933), First Lady of Mississippi
- Jacqueline Noel (1886–1964), leader in promoting the colonial history of the United States
- Addie Donnell Van Noppen (1870–1964), historian
- Cornelia Alice Norris (1857–1935), socialite, genealogist, and founding regent of the Caswell-Nash Chapter of the Daughters of the American Revolution
- Estella Armstrong O'Byrne (1891–1987), 20th DAR President General
- Florence Sillers Ogden (1891–1971), columnist, conservative activist, and segregationist
- Marie Watkins Oliver (1854–1944), designer of the Flag of Missouri
- Elizabeth Fry Page (1865–1943), author, editor
- Jane Marsh Parker (1836–1913), author, historian, clubwoman
- Fannie Brown Patrick (1864–1939), musician and leader in civic and social affairs
- Marguerite Courtright Patton (1889–1971), 21st DAR President General
- Alice Paul (1885–1977), American suffragist
- Maria Purdy Peck (1840–1914), essayist, social economist, civic leader; Regent for Iowa
- Theodora Agnes Peck (1882–1964), author and poet
- E. Jean Nelson Penfield (1872-1961), co-founder, League of Women Voters; National President, Kappa Kappa Gamma
- Isabel Weld Perkins (1876–1948), heiress, socialite, and author
- Edith Allen Phelps (1866–1945), twice president of the Oklahoma Library Association, the first professional in the Library Science field in the Oklahoma City system
- Loula Roberts Platt (1863–1934), suffragist and first woman to run for a seat in the North Carolina Senate
- Sarah Childress Polk (1803–1891), First Lady of the United States
- Frances Porcher (1853–1935), writer and journalist
- Delia Lyman Porter (1858–1933), author, social reformer, clubwoman
- Marjorie Merriweather Post (1887–1973), businesswoman, socialite, and philanthropist
- Adele Poston (1884–1979), pioneer in the field of psychiatric nursing
- Helena R. Hellwig Pouch (1874–1960), tennis player, 18th NSDAR President General
- Harriet Augusta Prunk (1840–1911), founder, Indiana Boston School of Elocution and Expression
- Sara Agnes Rice Pryor (1830–1912), writer and community activist
- Ada E. Purpus (1887–1954), member
- Emily Lee Sherwood Ragan (1839–1916), author, journalist
- Dorcas Reilly (1926–2018), chef and inventor of green bean casserole
- Emma May Alexander Reinertsen (1853–1920), writer
- Janet Reno (1938–2016), former attorney general of the United States
- Hester Dorsey Richardson (1862–1933), author
- Sarah Corbin Robert (1886–1972), 17th NSDAR President General
- Alice Mary Robertson (1854–1931), educator and public servant from Oklahoma, second woman to serve in the United States Congress
- Gertrude Ina Robinson (1868–1950), author, composer and harpist
- Lelia P. Roby (1848–1910), regent, DAR; founder, Ladies of the Grand Army of the Republic
- Grace Taylor Rodenbough (1897–1967), member of the North Carolina House of Representatives
- Emily Warren Roebling (1843–1903), engineer, known for her contribution to the completion of the Brooklyn Bridge
- Ginger Rogers (1911–1995), actress and dancer
- Eleanor Roosevelt (1884–1962), First Lady of the United States. She resigned her membership in protest of racism.
- Letitia Dowdell Ross (1866–1952), educator; leader of women's organizations
- Fannie Forbis Russel (1846–1934), one of the pioneer women of the state of Montana
- Susan Augusta Pike Sanders (1842–1931), national president of the Woman's Relief Corps
- Phyllis Schlafly (1924–2016), conservative political activist and writer
- Julia Green Scott (1839–1923), 8th NSDAR President General
- Betty Newkirk Seimes (died 1990), 27th NSDAR President General
- M. Elizabeth Shellabarger (1879–1967), Registered Nurse, army nurse overseas during World War I and director of American Red Cross Nursing Service in Albania and Montenegro
- Annie Bartlett Shepard (1861–1944), anti-suffrage activist
- Jessamine Shumate (1902–1990), noted artist and cartographer
- Eva Munson Smith (1843–1915), composer, poet, author
- Lura Eugenie Brown Smith (1854/64–1935), journalist, newspaper editor, author
- Margaret Chase Smith (1897–1995), US congresswoman and US senator
- Mary Bell Smith (1818–1894), educator and temperance leader
- Helen Norton Stevens (1869–1943), editor and clubwoman
- Mary Ingram Stille (1854–1935), historian, journalist, and temperance reformer
- Cornelia Branch Stone (1840–1925), president-general, United Daughters of the Confederacy; president, Texas Woman's Press Association
- Marian Estelle Melson Strack (1898–1974), socialite and antisemite
- Lillian Carpenter Streeter (1854–1935), social reformer, clubwoman, author
- Adele Woodhouse Erb Sullivan (1907–1999), 26th NSDAR President General
- Mary Florence Taney (1856–1936), founder of the National Society Colonial Dames XVII Century and the National Society of the Dames of the Court of Honor
- Mary Boyce Temple (1856–1929), philanthropist and socialite
- Minnie Louise Thomas (1861–1947), founder of Lenox Hall school for girls
- Vera Blanche Thomas (born 1903), president of the Arizona State Nurses' Association from 1927 to 1928
- Adaline Emerson Thompson (1859–1951), benefactor and educational leader
- Martha L. Poland Thurston (1849–1898), vice-president of the national body; also social leader, philanthropist, writer
- Lydia H. Tilton (1839–1915), lyricist of "Old Glory", the D.A.R. national song
- Lizabeth A. Turner (1829–1907), National President, Woman's Relief Corps
- Gertrude Vaile (1878–1954), social worker
- Gertrude Vanderbilt Whitney (1875–1942), sculptor, art patron and collector, and founder in 1931 of the Whitney Museum of American Art
- Maryly Van Leer Peck (1930–2011), Founder of Guam Community College, first female president of a Florida Community College, first woman chemical engineer graduate from Vanderbilt University. Received the National Community Service Award from DAR.
- Amy Robbins Ware (1877–1929), WWI veteran, author
- Maria Sanford (1836–1920), educator
- Leonora St. George Rogers Schuyler (1868–1952), President General of the United Daughters of the Confederacy
- Marion Margery Scranton (1884–1960), women's suffrage activist
- Julia Rice Seney (1853-1915), writer, newspaper editor, government administrator, and charity worker
- Flora Warren Seymour (1888–1948), writer, historian, author, first woman member of the Board of Indian Commissioners
- Patricia Walton Shelby (1928–2002), 32nd DAR President General
- Florence Warfield Sillers (1869–1958), historian and socialite, founding member of the Mississippi Delta chapter
- Abby Day Slocomb (1836–1917), inventor, historic preservationist, philanthropist, and designer of the Flag of Connecticut
- Emily Goodrich Smith (1830–1903), newspaper correspondent
- Jane Farwell Smith (1906–1997), 30th DAR President General
- Eleanor Washington Spicer (1903–1974), 28th DAR President General
- Jennie O. Starkey (ca. 1856 – 1918) was an American journalist
- Elizabeth Willisson Stephen (1856–1925), author
- Letitia Stevenson (1843–1913), Second Lady of the United States, 4th NSDAR President General
- Daisy Allen Story (1858–1932), suffragist and 9th NSDAR President General
- May Erwin Talmadge (1885–1973), 19th NSDAR President General
- Jeannette Throckmorton (1883–1963), president, State Society of Iowa Medical Women
- Mary Oates Spratt Van Landingham (1852–1937), North Carolina State Regent, NSDAR Vice President General
- Fay Webb-Gardner (1885–1969), First Lady of North Carolina
- Agnes Wright Spring (1894–1988), journalist and historian
- Adelaide Cilley Waldron (1843–1909), author, editor, clubwoman
- Ellen Hardin Walworth (1832–1915), writer, lawyer, and co-founder of the DAR
- Reubena Hyde Walworth (1867–1898), wartime nurse, poet, and suffragist
- Eugenia Washington (1838–1900), historian, civil servant, and co-founder of the DAR
- Almyra Maynard Watson (1917–2018), officer in the United States Army Nurse Corps
- Margaret Anderson Watts (1832–1905), social reformer, temperance activist, and writer
- Jeanne Fox Weinmann (1874–1962), president national of the U.S. Daughters of 1812 and president general of the United Daughters of the Confederacy
- Doris Pike White (1896–1987), investment banker and 24th NSDAR President General
- Rassie Hoskins White (1862–1944), President General of the United Daughters of the Confederacy
- Helen Augusta Whittier (1846–1925), editor, lecturer, teacher, clubwoman, businesswoman
- Margaret Ray Wickens (1843–1918), national president of the Woman's Relief Corps
- Juliet Marshall Blackburn Williams (1857–1928), civic leader
- Margaret O'Connor Wilson (1856–1942), President General of the Confederated Southern Memorial Association
- Helen M. Winslow (1851–1938), editor, author, publisher, and journalist
- Kathryn Slaughter Wittichen (1896–1985), founder and Honorary President of the Southern Dames of America, President General of the United Daughters of the Confederacy, and President of the Miami Women's Club
- Grace Steele Woodward (1899–1987), writer and historian
- Merry Ann Thompson Wright (1943–2022), CEO of the American Lung Association of Central New York and 42nd NSDAR President General
- Josephine McDonald Yarbrough (1879–1961), writer and clubwoman
- Marie Hirst Yochim (1920–2012), 25th NSDAR President General

== Fictional members ==
- Abbey Bartlet (portrayed by Stockard Channing), fictional character in the television series The West Wing
- Zoey Bartlet (portrayed by Elisabeth Moss), fictional character in the television series The West Wing
- Marion Cotesworth-Haye (portrayed by Helen Slayton-Hughes), fictional character in the television series The West Wing
- Heidi Choat (portrayed by Andrea Savage), fictional character in the television series The West Wing
- Mellie Grant (portrayed by Bellamy Young), fictional character in the television series Scandal
- Emily Gilmore (portrayed by Kelly Bishop), fictional character in the television series Gilmore Girls and the miniseries Gilmore Girls: A Year in the Life
- Rory Gilmore (portrayed by Alexis Bledel), fictional character in the television series Gilmore Girls and the miniseries Gilmore Girls: A Year in the Life
- Lovey Howell (portrayed by Natalie Schafer), fictional character in the television series Gilligan's Island
- Nora (portrayed by Jane Carr), fictional character in the television series Gilmore Girls
- Carol Stiles (portrayed by Catherine McGoohan), fictional character in the television series Gilmore Girls
- Sunny (portrayed by Jacqueline Schultz), fictional character in the television series Gilmore Girls
- Natalie Swope (portrayed by Judy Geeson), fictional character in the television series Gilmore Girls
