= Calhoun, Missouri =

- City
- Location of Calhoun, Missouri
- Coordinates: 38°28′06″N 93°37′30″W
- Country: United States
- State: Missouri
- County: Henry

Area
  - Total: 1.00 sq mi (2.58 km^{2})
  - Land: 0.98 sq mi (2.55 km^{2})
  - Water: 0.012 sq mi (0.03 km^{2})
- Elevation: 781 ft (238 m)

Population (2020)
  - Total: 392
  - Density: 398.4/sq mi (153.81/km^{2})
- Time zone: UTC-6 (Central (CST))
  - Summer (DST): UTC-5 (CDT)
- ZIP code: 65323
- Area code: 660
- FIPS code: 29-10450
- GNIS feature ID: 2393494
- Website: calhounmo.com

Calhoun is a city in Henry County, Missouri, United States. As of the 2020 census, Calhoun had a population of 392.

== History ==
Calhoun was platted in 1837. The town was named after John C. Calhoun, seventh Vice President of the United States. A post office called Calhoun has been in operation since 1844.

== Geography ==
According to the United States Census Bureau, the city has a total area of 0.99 square miles (2.56 km^{2}), of which 0.98 square miles (2.54 km^{2}) is land and 0.01 square miles (0.03 km^{2}) is water.

== Demographics ==
Historical population
Census	Pop.	Note	%±
1880	492		—
1890	698		41.9%
1900	561		−19.6%
1910	684		21.9%
1920	603		−11.8%
1930	501		−16.9%
1940	521		4.0%
1950	463		−11.1%
1960	374		−19.2%
1970	360		−3.7%
1980	427		18.6%
1990	450		5.4%
2000	491		9.1%
2010	469		−4.5%
2020	392		−16.4%
U.S. Decennial Census

=== 2010 census ===
As of the census of 2010, there were 469 people, 175 households, and 115 families living in the city. The population density was 478.6 inhabitants per square mile (184.8/km^{2}). There were 208 housing units at an average density of 212.2 per square mile (81.9/km^{2}). The racial makeup of the city was 97.7% White, 0.2% African American, 0.2% Native American, 0.6% Asian, and 1.3% from two or more races. Hispanic or Latino of any race were 0.4% of the population.

There were 175 households, of which 33.1% had children under the age of 18 living with them, 44.0% were married couples living together, 14.3% had a female householder with no husband present, 7.4% had a male householder with no wife present, and 34.3% were non-families. 29.7% of all households were made up of individuals, and 9.2% had someone living alone who was 65 years of age or older. The average household size was 2.68 and the average family size was 3.23.

The median age in the city was 37.2 years. 26.7% of residents were under the age of 18; 9.3% were between the ages of 18 and 24; 22.5% were from 25 to 44; 28.9% were from 45 to 64; and 12.6% were 65 years of age or older. The gender makeup of the city was 50.1% male and 49.9% female.

=== 2000 census ===
As of the census of 2000, there were 491 people, 189 households, and 123 families living in the city. The population density was 496.5 inhabitants per square mile (191.7/km^{2}). There were 211 housing units at an average density of 213.4 per square mile (82.4/km^{2}). The racial makeup of the city was 97.35% White, 0.81% Native American, 1.02% Pacific Islander, and 0.81% from two or more races. Hispanic or Latino of any race were 0.20% of the population.

There were 189 households, out of which 34.4% had children under the age of 18 living with them, 51.9% were married couples living together, 10.6% had a female householder with no husband present, and 34.4% were non-families. 31.2% of all households were made up of individuals, and 20.6% had someone living alone who was 65 years of age or older. The average household size was 2.60 and the average family size was 3.31.

In the city the population was spread out, with 29.1% under the age of 18, 6.9% from 18 to 24, 25.1% from 25 to 44, 23.2% from 45 to 64, and 15.7% who were 65 years of age or older. The median age was 36 years. For every 100 females, there were 96.4 males. For every 100 females age 18 and over, there were 95.5 males.

The median income for a household in the city was $25,417, and the median income for a family was $31,964. Males had a median income of $22,292 versus $17,750 for females. The per capita income for the city was $11,326. About 18.1% of families and 26.5% of the population were below the poverty line, including 36.5% of those under age 18 and 32.2% of those age 65 or over.

== Notable people ==
- Dorla Eaton Kemper (1929–2025), 37th President General of the Daughters of the American Revolution
