= Elizabeth Willisson Stephen =

American author (1856–1925)

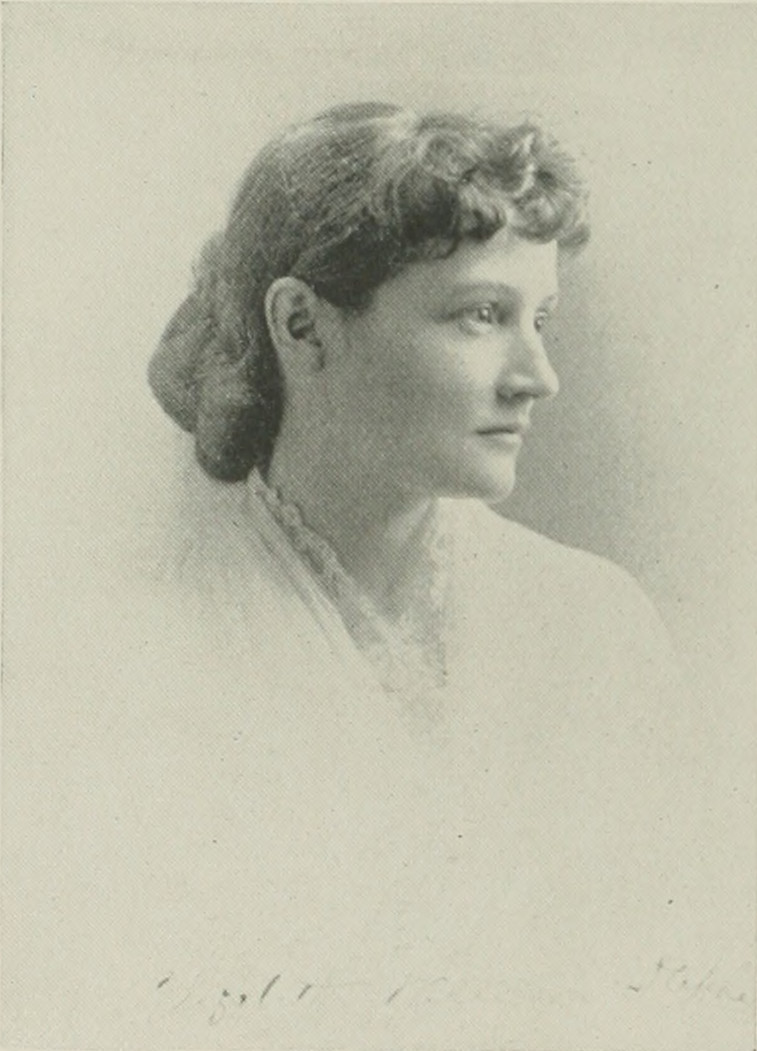
- Photo in A Woman of the Century
- Born: Elizabeth Octavia Willisson; March 21, 1856; Marengo County, Alabama, U.S.
- Died: December 19, 1925 (aged 69)
- Occupation: author
- Spouse: William Oscar Stephen (m. 1888)
- Children: 2
- Writing career
- Pen name: Mrs. J. M. Winton; several, unknown
- Language: English
- Genres: novel; poetry; prose
- Notable work: The Confessions of Two

Elizabeth Willisson Stephen (March 21, 1856 – December 19, 1925) was an American author. Since 1878, she contributed prose and poetry to the northern and southern press. Her poem, "Mine", published in the Gulf Citizen, was characterized as classic in its treatment. With her mother, she was the co-author of The Confessions of Two, a novel.

== Early life ==
Elizabeth Octavia Willisson was born in Marengo County, Alabama, near Mobile, Alabama, March 21, 1856. Her parents were Edward Fisher Willisson (1819–1858) and Marianne Gendron Gaillard Spratley (1834–1912). Her paternal ancestry was English, and some of them were noted figures of the American Revolutionary War period. Her mother's family was of Huguenot descent, and the name of Marion was conspicuous on their family tree. Thomas Gaillard, her maternal grandfather, ranked high as an ecclesiastical historian. Her grandmother, Mrs. Willisson, was an intellectual woman, who fostered the little girl's love for books and cultivated her intellect. Elizabeth grew up in the world of books, writing stories and verses.

== Career ==
Before marriage, and with her mother, Elizabeth co-authored the novel, The Confessions of Two.

Stephen's writing opportunities widened after her marriage in 1888. Beside the novel, she wrote much, both in prose and verse, for various newspapers and periodicals. She composed a poem in honor of the ceremony to commemorate Macon, Missouri's "Red Letter Day", when the corner stone of Blees Military Academy was laid.

== Personal life ==
In 1888, she married William Oscar Stephen (1855–1928), a Presbyterian clergyman. They had two children, Walter Willisson Stephen (1890–1958) and William Oscar Stephen (1893–1973). She took an active interest in her husband's work and in all religious progress.

For a time, her home was in Rockport, Indiana, and then Macon, Missouri. She left Macon in August 1899 for Peeksville, Wisconsin and other points in northern Wisconsin, on account of ill health. She returned to Macon later in the year before leaving again, this time for Virginia, in December 1899, because of frail health.

Stephen was a member of the Daughters of the American Revolution.

== Selected works ==
=== Novels ===
- Confessions of Two: A Novel, by Marianne Gaillard Spratley & Elizabeth Octavia Willisson (1886)

=== Poetry ===
- "The Call of the Hills"
- "Divided"
- "John Hall"
- "Mine"
- "Recuerdo. To Augusta Evans Wilson."
- "The Revolution's Dawn"
