= Mary Ingram Stille =

American historian and temperance reformer (1854–1935)

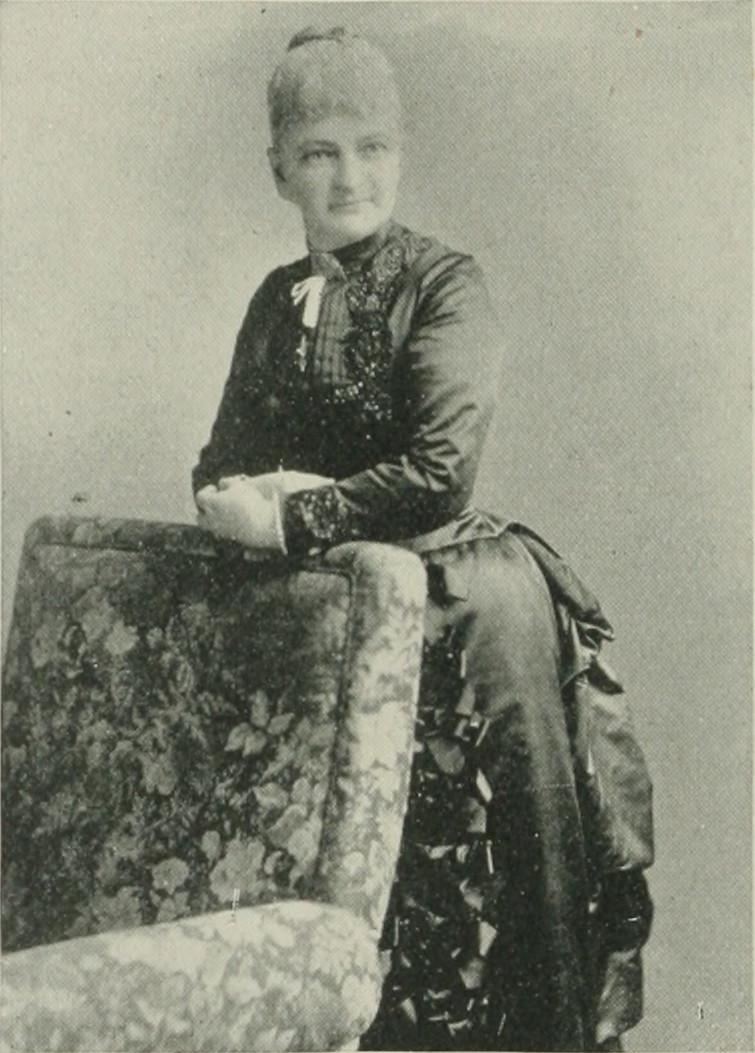
Photo in A Woman of the Century

Mary Ingram Stille (July 1, 1854 – November 4, 1935) was an American historian, journalist, and temperance reformer. The early success of the Woman's Christian Temperance Union (W.C.T.U.) in Pennsylvania was largely due through her efforts.

== Early life and education ==
Mary Ingram Stille was born in West Chester, Pennsylvania, July 1, 1854. She was the oldest of the three daughters of Abram and Hannah Jefferis Stille. She represented on the father's side the fifth generation of the Philips family, who came to the U.S. from Wales in 1755. On her mother's side, she was the seventh in descent from George and Jane Chandler, who came to the U.S. in 1687 from England. Her ancestors served in the American Revolution, and her grandfather, Josiah Philips, was called out by President George Washington to aid in the suppression of the Whiskey Rebellion.

Stille's education was begun in Pine Hall Seminary, in the borough, and was continued in Lewisburg Institute, now Bucknell University.

== Career ==
Stille was an advocate of equal suffrage. She was the first woman appointed by the Pennsylvania Agricultural Society as superintendent of woman's work. In 1889, she had charge of the fine art display in their fair in Philadelphia. Without instructions from her predecessor, and under unfavorable circumstances, she worked the department up to such a condition as to win the commendation of the officers. Her systematic arrangements and business ability greatly contributed to the success of the exposition.

From childhood she was associated with Sunday-school work, and for years was prominent in the primary department. By virtue of her ancestry, Stille was a member of the Washington Chapter of the Daughters of the American Revolution (D.A.R.). After a reconstruction of the organization, she was made a charter member. She served as Historian of Chester County Chapter, D.A.R., and as an officer (Councillor) of the Chester County Historical Society.

In May, 1884, the first organization of the W.C.T.U. was effected in West Chester, and, having always supported the cause of temperance, she at once identified herself with the work and became a useful member. She filled positions in the State and national divisions of the temperance work. In 1889 and 1890, she was actively engaged in the State headquarters, assisting in that work, and when the new State organ was published, she held the position of treasurer as long as that office existed. The early success of the venture was largely due to her efforts.

She possessed a natural ability and special liking for journalism, but her home responsibilities prevented her from devoting her time solely to that profession. Her writing included poetry and prose, much of it tributes to friends, as well as articles for the local press, which were largely copied.

== Personal life ==
In religion, she was a Quaker by birth, but later became a member of the Presbyterian Church.

Following a stroke, Mary Ingram Stille at the Chester County Hospital (now University of Pennsylvania Health System) on November 4, 1935.
