= Lenox Hall =

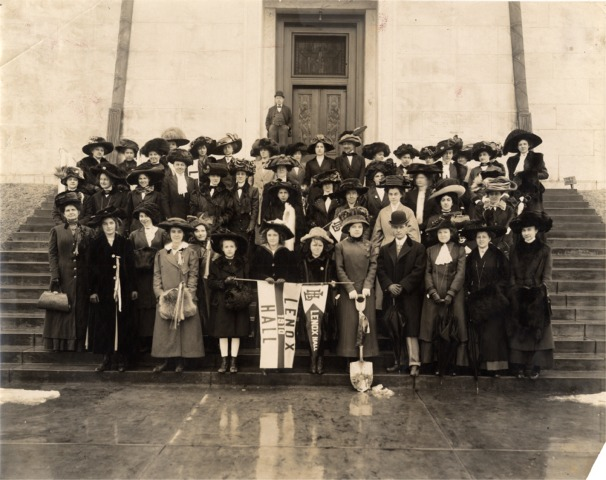
- Teachers and students, 1910
- St. Louis, Missouri, USA

Information
- Type: Non-sectarian resident and day school
- Established: 1907
- Founder: M. Louise Thomas
- Principal: M. Louise Thomas
- Grades: 5-12
- Gender: female
- Language: English

Lenox Hall was a non-sectarian resident and day school for girls and young women in St. Louis, Missouri. Located on Taylor and McPherson, it was situated four blocks west of Limit Walk, the western boundary of the city of St. Louis. It was established by M. Louise Thomas, the principal, in September 1907. In 1910, the architects of the Cathedral Basilica of Saint Louis, Barnett, Haynes & Barnett, were chosen to design the new Lenox Hall, in University City, Missouri, early English in type.

Lenox Hall was affiliated with University of Missouri–St. Louis, Washington University in St. Louis, Wellesley College, Smith College, and other colleges of the East and South admitting women.

== Early history ==
On coming to St. Louis to establish a school, a name could not be decided upon, and it was while walking with her father, discussing the question, that they came upon Lenox Place—a beautiful residence portion of the city. "Here" she said, "is a name, suitable, musical and short, and if it stands for someone great and good, we will adopt it." Referring to the encyclopedia it was found that James Lenox was an American bibliophilist and philanthropist, founder of the Lenox Library in New York City for public reference, built in 1870. Later, this was combined with the Astor and Tilden Libraries as the New York Public Library.

Without a pupil registered or one promised, Thomas went ahead and opened Lenox Hall, engaging a faculty and arranging a course of study covering all grades of college preparatory work. She also selected a graduate of Pratt Institute for a full course in domestic science; established a full art course under competent teachers; and engaged instructors for piano, voice and violin.

Thomas believed that there would be a demand for such a school in this growing metropolis. He was proved correct, since every year it became necessary to add to the capacity of the institution, as several buildings were rented to accommodate the resident pupils.

The well-equipped school had accommodation for forty resident pupils, representing twelve states but largely from the Southwest.

== Move to University City ==
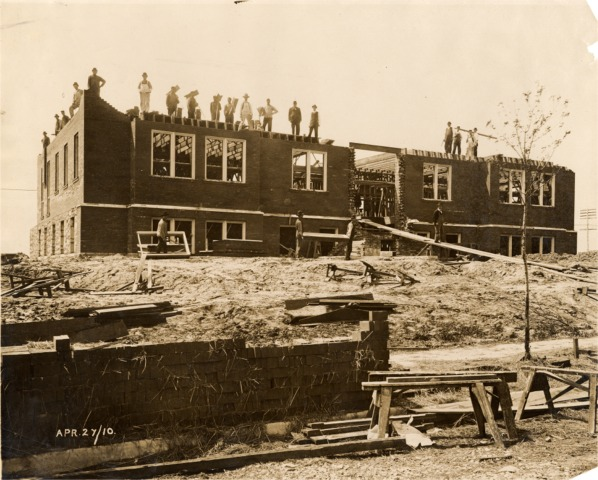
Lenox Hall's new building in University City was designed by Barnett, Haynes and Barnett. In this photograph taken of the north facade on Washington Avenue on April 27, 1910, construction is well under way.

In 1911, the move was made to the new building in University City, planned and devised in every detail by Thomas herself. Some discouraging experiences were hers after deciding to build this new school; she went to bankers, trust companies, rich women, and to everyone who she thought might be influenced to build such a one as she would require, but not a single word of encouragement, satisfaction or assistance could she obtain until Mrs. Edward Gardner Lewis, the president of the American Woman's Republic (AWR), interested her husband, and he made it possible to carry out her plans.

== Course of study ==
The school, while not sectarian, was distinctly Christian in its religious influences. The studies embraced grades which corresponded to the courses of the public school system from the 5th grade upward. The Academy course prepared for colleges and universities. Special departments dealt with piano, voice, violin, art, expression, domestic science, textile and domestic arts, art appreciation, dancing, and home topics.

The course of study prescribed by Thomas was elastic and the methods of teaching vary each year according to age, development, tastes and interest of the pupils. She believed that "what we teach has higher ends than merely being taught and learned," and held that the supreme end of education was the formation of character, therefore all subjects were dealt with vitally and with relation to the life of the individual pupil, whose sense of responsibility was thus awakened and gradually developed so that the foundation was laid upon which to build a future, well-ordered, satisfying life. Thomas laid much stress upon the moral as well as the religious training of the girls under her care. Much individual work was done teaching students to analyze, systematize, and correlate their work. Suggestive talks were given on the value of concentration, accurate and independent thinking, sustained attention, etc.

== Social training ==
Realizing the importance of definite training of the social instincts and the necessity of affording maturing womanhood an opportunity to exercise the natural tendencies of her social being, Thomas endorsed various forms of entertainment by which the young girl may learn the grace and charm which characterizes "gentle womanhood," and which gave every opportunity for enjoyment, instruction and means of acquiring ease and grace of manner in conversation. She believed that social training was essential in the development of poise, and in the cultivation of the faculty of being interested in things—the best things. It was the means whereby the facts of scholarships were translated into terms of life and the individual developed into an active, efficient social unit. Just as growth was secured by cultivation so was development made sure by expression.

Social training was the means for the expression of education; it was the opportunity for "applied culture," and was as essential a factor in the development of an effective personality as was the storing up of facts which in themselves made but a "dead scholarship." Thomas also advocated the study of languages as being a decided advantage to every woman.

It was the custom of the principal of Lenox Hall to entertain, at intervals, house guests of distinction and recognized culture, giving the pupils the opportunity of coming into close personal touch with men and women whose wealth of experience and achievement was an inspiration. Many of the principal educators of Eastern colleges, as well as authors of note, enjoyed this courtesy—among them James Monroe Taylor, 4th president of Vassar College; Ruth McEnery Stuart; Bertha Kunz-Baker; Florence Howe Hall, daughter of Julia Ward Howe; Belva Ann Lockwood; Samantha A. Huntley; Alfred D'Orsay Tennyson Dickens.

== Student life ==
Lenox Hall accommodated thirty-seven students and provided the benefits of a country home to its pupils, while also having the opportunities for culture available to a school in a large city.

The aim of Thomas was to establish a relation of friendship between teacher and pupil, as well as to develop ideals which will be of lasting influence in building up a cultured and refined womanhood. In large institutions general classifications and uniform demands are imperative, but in the small private school it was possible for each pupil to have such individual attention that her instruction was adapted to her especial needs, and her mental and physical growth stimulated and encouraged by a healthful and normal process.
