= Wayne Garrison Blair =

American clubwoman

36th President General, National Society Daughters of the American Revolution
- In office 1992–1995
- Preceded by: Marie Hirst Yochim
- Succeeded by: Dorla Eaton Kemper

Personal details
- Born: Betty Jane Garrison; June 14, 1930 Bethel, Missouri, U.S.
- Died: October 19, 2000 (aged 70) Sarasota, Florida, U.S.
- Spouse: Donald Shattuck Blair Jr.
- Children: 2

Betty Jane "Wayne" Garrison Blair (June 14, 1930 – October 19, 2000) was an American clubwoman who served as the 36th president general of the Daughters of the American Revolution.

== Clubs ==
Blair was a member of the National Society Colonial Dames XVII Century and the Daughters of the American Revolution. She joined the Betty Washington DAR chapter in Kansas as a junior member in 1963. In 1969, upon her move to Ohio she transferred to the Cuyahoga Portage Chapter, where she later was elected regent. Blair was elected as president general of the Daughters of the American Revolution in April 1992. She served as president general from 1992 to 1995.

In April 1993, she was a guest speaker at the Georgia Society DAR annual state conference. In February 1994, Blair attended the North Carolina Society DAR's annual state conference in Pinehurst, North Carolina. In October 1994, she made an official visit to Salt Lake City, where she was the guest of honor at a banquet hosted by the Utah State Officers Club at the Lion House.

== Personal life ==
She was married to Donald Shattuck Blair Jr., with whom she had 2 children Her daughter served as a colonel in the United States Army Nurse Corps.
