= Dorla Eaton Kemper =

American civic leader (1929–2025)

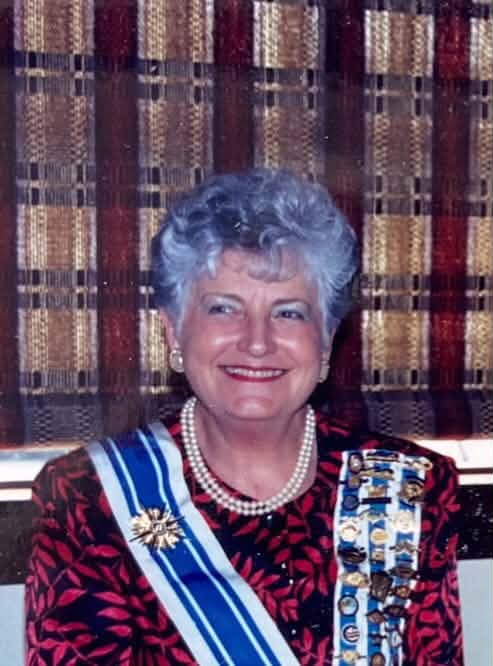
- Kemper in 1990

37th President General of the National Society Daughters of the American Revolution
- In office 1995–1998
- Preceded by: Wayne Garrison Blair
- Succeeded by: Georgane Ferguson Love

Personal details
- Born: Dorla Dean Eaton; September 10, 1929 Calhoun, Missouri, U.S.
- Died: June 19, 2025 (aged 95)
- Spouse: Charles Keil Kemper

Dorla Dean Eaton Kemper (September 10, 1929 – June 19, 2025) was an American civic leader who served as the 37th president general of the Daughters of the American Revolution.

== Biography ==
Kemper was born Dorla Dean Eaton on September 10, 1929, in Calhoun, Missouri, to Paul McVay Eaton and Jessie Lee Eaton.

She joined the Emigrant Trail Chapter of the National Society Daughters of the American Revolution in Auburn, California, on April 17, 1971. She served as the State Regent of California DAR from 1984 to 1986 and as Recording Secretary General of the national society from 1986 to 1989.

She served as the thirty-seventh president general of the national society. During her presidency, she awarded members of the society the "Kemper Key".

In May 1995, she was invited by Elizabeth II to attend a Thanksgiving service at St Paul's Cathedral commemorating the end of World War II.

In 1996, she attended the Nevada State Society DAR conference in Las Vegas and the Oklahoma State Society DAR conference.

In 1997, the Children of the American Revolution (CAR) sued the Daughters of the American Revolution following Kemper locking them out of their headquarters at DAR Constitution Hall. The Children of the American Revolution and the Daughters of the American Revolution signed a contract, granting use to the CAR in DAR's headquarters, in 1950. The contract expired in 1995, during Kemper's presidency. Kemper stated she would not renew the contract because DAR bylaws barred her from signing any pact that extends six months past her term as president general. Kemper also stated that the 1950 contract gave the CAR an unacceptable "easement in perpetuity, meaning they are entitled to a legal interest in the present office space forever."

Kemper attended the dedication ceremony for the Military Women's Memorial in Washington, D.C. She and Honorary President General Ann Fleck led a candlelight march with over fourteen-thousand participants across the Arlington Memorial Bridge.

Kemper died on June 19, 2025, at the age of 95.
