= M. Louise Thomas =

American educator and founder of Lenox Hall

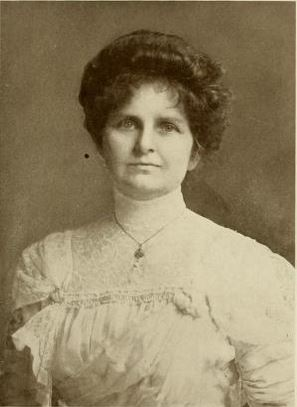
M. Louise Thomas

Minnie Louise Thomas (née Russell; 1861–1947) was an American educator and the founder of Lenox Hall, a school for girls in St. Louis, Missouri.

== Early life and education ==
Minnie Louise Russell was born in 1861 in Columbia, Missouri, to Thomas Allen Russell, a circuit court judge in St. Louis, and Martha Louisa Lenoir. She moved with her family to St. Louis as a young child and graduated from a public high school in the city.

Russell attended the University of Missouri, where she was awarded a gold medal for excellence in oratory by the Press Association. The Press Association initially awarded two gold medals, one for men and one for women. According to Johnson, Russell and other women saw this as discriminatory and advocated for a single competition, where men and women would be judged equally.

== Career and publications ==
After her marriage, Thomas enjoyed a comfortable life. However, when she needed to support herself and two daughters, she became a teacher at Hardin College and Conservatory of Music in Mexico, Missouri, where she could keep her children with her. There, she created a lecture series for girls, "Round Table Talks", which she continued at Lenox Hall. These talks covered topics such as morals, ethics, social life, and attitudes towards those with bad habits.

After six years at Hardin, she sought an environment where she could more fully implement her ideals for girls' education. Despite receiving offers to lead girls' schools in Montana and St. Louis, she decided to establish her own school. Following the death of Martha H. Matthews, principal of Hosmer Hall in St. Louis, Thomas founded Lenox Hall in September 1907 as a resident and day school for girls and young women.

At Lenox Hall, Thomas advocated for a balanced approach to the education of young women. Students were taught life values, such as honesty and good manners, in addition to their education in art and science. Thomas believed this approach would decrease the rising rate of divorce.

In 1910, Thomas announced that Lenox Hall would move to a new building in University City, Missouri. The groundbreaking ceremony took place on March 2, 1910. In 1920, Thomas relocated Lenox Hall again to Kirkwood, Missouri.

In 1928, Thomas attempted to transition administration of the school to the alumnae. Alumnae attempted to raise $30,000 to pay off the school’s debt, but were unsuccessful. The next year Thomas closed the school. She presided over Lenox Hall as principal and president for 22 years.

Thomas contributed an article to The World's Work's 1912 Hand Book of Schools, a guide for parents. Other contributors included professors from Columbia University, magazine editors, and school presidents. She also frequently wrote prose and poetry for magazines and periodicals. One of her poems, sent as a New Year's greeting to the school's patrons, was adopted by the president of the Mothers' Congress of Texas and distributed to its members.

In 1888, Thomas was a founding member and officer of the National and International Council for Women.

== Personal life ==
M. Louise Russell married J. D. Thomas and had three children: Raydell T. Watson (1891–1974), Russell A. Thomas (died in 1895), and Louise Le Noir Thomas, a women's suffrage advocate. Thomas's parents were Thomas Allen Russell and Martha Louisa Lenoir.

She was a member of the Daughters of the American Revolution.

Thomas died in 1947 in Indianapolis, Indiana.
