= Ada E. Purpus =

Postmaster of Laguna Beach, California

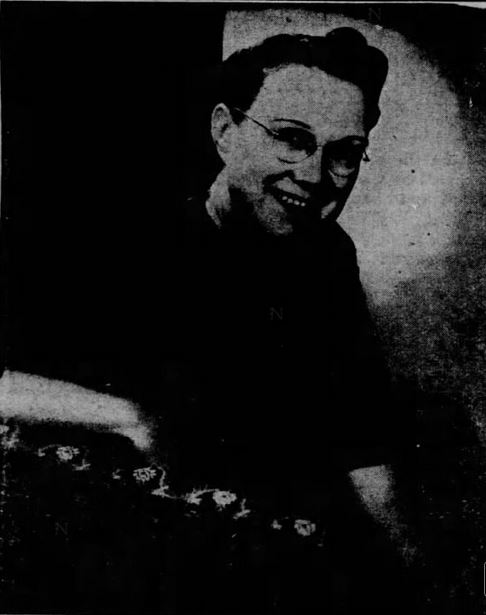
Ada E. Purpus

Ada E. Schnitzer Purpus (November 22, 1887 – November 29, 1954) was the postmaster of Laguna Beach and president of the Chamber of Commerce.

== Early life ==
Ada E. Schnitzer was born November 22, 1887, in Hannibal, Missouri, the daughter of O. C. Schnitzer.

== Career ==
Ada E. Purpus was active in club and civic work.

She was the president of the Parent-Teacher Association at the John Muir Junior High School.

She was the Director of Music of the West Ebell Woman's Club.

She was a memberof Daughters of the American Revolution and Los Angeles City Club.

She was the manager of the Laguna Beach Villa, housekeeping cottages and sleeping rooms located in the center of Laguna Beach near the beaches.

She was president of the Laguna Beach Woman's Club.

Since 1934 she was the postmaster of Laguna Beach. During her engagement, the new Laguna Beach post office was opened and she was honored for her services.

In 1934 she directed the Laguna Art Colony at the 11th annual Minstrel Show at the Community Playhouse.

She was the president of the Laguna Beach Business and Professional Woman's Club. During her presidency, she approved the efforts of the state authorities to stem the tide of indigent migratory workers into California.

Until 1942 she was president of the Laguna Beach Chamber of Commerce.

During World War II she took an active part in the coordination of Laguna Beach women's groups in the war effort.

== Personal life ==
Ada E. Purpus moved to California in 1915 and lived at 1809 W. 50th Street, Los Angeles, California. She married Roy William Purpus and had one daughter, Jean Blair.
