= Roberta Tidmore =

American military veteran (born 1922)

Personal details
- Born: Roberta Jane Randolph; March 19, 1922 (age 104) Cedar Rapids, Iowa, U.S.
- Spouse: Terry Tidmore
- Education: University of Iowa

Military service
- Allegiance: United States
- Branch/service: United States Marine Corps
- Years of service: 1944–1946
- Rank: sergeant
- Awards: American Campaign Medal; World War II Victory Medal

Roberta Jane Randolph Tidmore (born March 19, 1922) is an American military veteran who served in the United States Marine Corps during World War II as part of the Marine Corps Women's Reserve. In the 1970s, she served as president of the Women's Marine Association.

== Biography ==
Tidmore was born Roberta Jane Randolph in Cedar Rapids, Iowa in March 1922 to Clyde Randolph and Laura Mildenstein Randolph. She entered a five-year dual degree nursing program at the University of Iowa, but did not finish.

At the beginning of World War II, she moved to Rockford, Illinois and worked as a "Rosie the Riveter" for J.I. Case Company, a farm equipment manufacturer that was producing airplane parts for the war.

In 1944, Tidmore joined the United States Marine Corps as one of 18,000 women who joined the Marines by that year, and went to boot camp training at Camp Lejeune in Jacksonville, North Carolina. She was assigned as a chauffeur for military officers, transporting them from Quantico to Washington, D.C.. She was then assigned to the Marine Corps Recruit Depot San Diego. She was awarded both the American Campaign Medal and the World War II Victory Medal.

She was discharged in August 1946, following the end of World War II, with the rank of sergeant. She was an active Women's Marine Association member, serving as president in the 1970s. After leaving the military, she was employed by United Airlines as a flight attendant, chief stewardess, and chief supervisor.

She married Terry Tidmore, a lieutenant colonel in the U.S. Navy, on July 4, 1960 in Winterhaven, California and left United Airlines, instead working as a tomato farmer with her husband in Southern California.

Tidmore volunteers with the Salvation Army, the Special Olympics, the Globe Theater, and the Daughters of the American Revolution. In 2021, she was named as a Woman of Dedication by the Salvation Army's Women's Auxiliary of San Diego County. In 2016, she was selected to be part of the 2016 Honor Flight to Washington, D.C., spotlighting World War II veterans.

In March 2025, she celebrated her 103rd birthday at the San Diego History Center.
