= Betty Newkirk Seimes =

27th president general of the Daughters of the American Revolution

27th DAR President General, National Society Daughters of the American Revolution
- In office 1968–1971
- Preceded by: Adele Woodhouse Erb Sullivan
- Succeeded by: Eleanor Washington Spicer

Personal details
- Born: Wilmington, Delaware, U.S.
- Died: January 25, 1990 Delaware City, Delaware, U.S.
- Spouse: Erwin F. Seimes
- Education: Goldey Wilmington Commercial College

Elizabeth Newkirk Seimes (died January 25, 1990) was an American clubwoman who served as the 27th President General of the Daughters of the American Revolution.

== Personal life ==
Elizabeth Newkirk Seimes was born in Wilmington, Delaware. She attended Alexis I. duPont High School and Goldey Wilmington Commercial College (now Goldey–Beacom College). Betty married Erwin F Seimes, who died in 1970, and both are buried in Gracelawn Memorial Park in New Castle, DE. Betty worked as a secretary and office manager for Allied Kid Company of Wilmington and as the executive secretary for Governor Richard C. McMullen, from 1937 to 1941. She died of heart failure on January 25, 1990, in Easton, Maryland.

== DAR Membership ==
Seimes was elected DAR President General in 1968, having joined the DAR the Cooch's Bridge Chapter of Delaware in 1938. She helped organize the Colonel David Hall Chapter in Lewes, DE, 1951. She served as State Regent of Delaware, Recording Secretary General, and First Vice President General. She received the Sons of the American Revolution Gold Good Citizenship Medal in 1977 from the Delaware State Society.

=== President General Administration ===
Seimes was elected President General in 1968 and installed during the 77th Continental Congress, having defeated Dorothy W. S. Ragan. Her slate of executive officers were:

- First Vice President General: Mrs. Henry Stewart Jones
- Chaplain General: Mrs. Ralph Allen Killey
- Recording Secretary General: Mrs. Lyle Johnston Howland
- Corresponding Secretary General: Mrs. George Jacob Walz
- Organizing Secretary General: Mrs. Wilson King Barnes
- Treasurer General: Mrs. Nile Eugene Faust
- Registrar General: Mrs. Richard Denny Shelby
- Historian General: Mrs. Donald Spicer
- Librarian General: Mrs. George Sprague Tolman III
- Curator General: Mrs. Carl William Kietzman
- Reporter General: Mrs. Lawrence Russell Andrus

She had three themes, one for each year of her administration: 1st year: “One Country, One Constitution, One Destiny;” 2nd year: “God grants liberty only to those who love it, and are always ready to guard and defend it;” 3rd year: “Where Law Ends, Tyranny Begins,” by William Pitt. Her symbol was a four-leaf clover and her unofficial project was “tying up loose ends.”

Seimes' administration coincided with the Vietnam War, which impacted their work. As part of the DAR's mission of Patriotism, they authorized Certificates of Honor to be presented to the families of servicemen killed in the war. As President General Sullivan before her had done, Seimes spoke out against the burning of draft cards. She called it "near treason," and advocated for strong punishment.

Highlights from the Seimes administration include:

- Installation of computers for administrative use and membership records
- Establishment of the Seimes Microfilm Center (later Seimes Technology Center)
- Construction of the Seimes-Thomas Classroom Building at Kate Duncan Smith DAR School
- Focus on reduction of debt and cost-cutting measures
- Completion of the indexing and cataloguing of the Americana Collection
- The 80th Continental Congress was aired on NBC, with President Richard Nixon giving an address
- Seimes represented the DAR on The Dick Cavett Show on 14 July 1970

== Other Associations ==
- The National Gavel Society (President, 1972–1975)
- Rehoboth Art League
- Colonial Dames of America
- National Society of Daughters of Founders and Patriots of America
