= Daughters of the American Revolution =

Nonprofit lineage organization

- National Society Daughters of the American Revolution

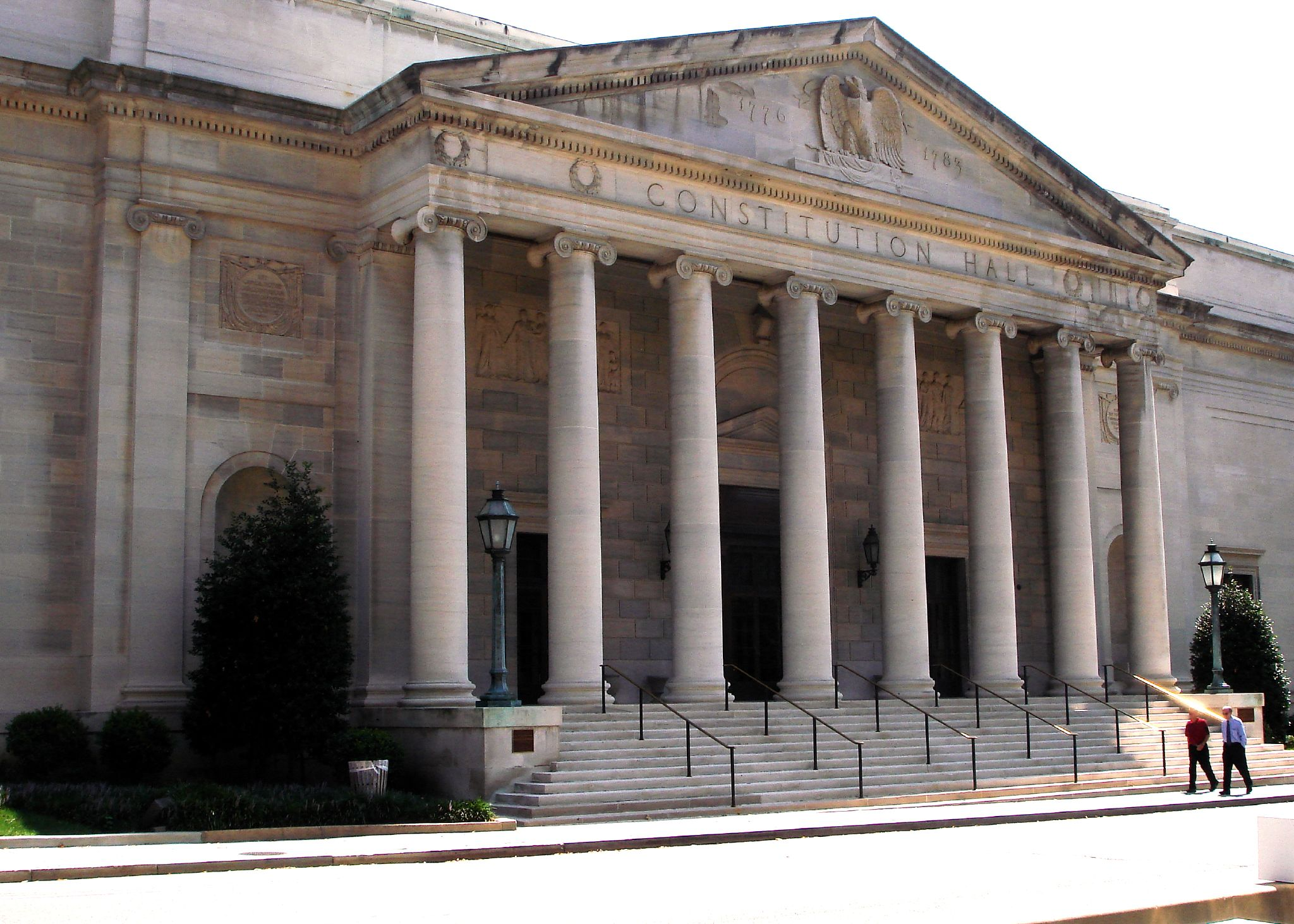
- DAR Constitution Hall in Washington, D.C.
- Abbreviation: NSDAR or DAR
- Founded: October 11, 1890
- Founders: Mary Desha; Mary Smith Lockwood; Ellen Hardin Walworth; Eugenia Washington
- Founded at: Strathmore Arms; 810 12th Street NW; Washington, D.C., U.S.
- Type: Non-profit, lineage society, service organization
- Headquarters: Memorial Continental Hall; 1776 D Street NW; Washington, D.C., U.S.
- Members: 190,000
- President General: Ginnie Sebastian Storage
- Publication: American Monthly (1892–2001); American Spirit Magazine (2001–present); Daughters Magazine (2001–present)
- Affiliations: Children of the American Revolution
- Website: dar.org

The National Society Daughters of the American Revolution (often abbreviated as DAR or NSDAR) is a federally chartered lineage-based membership service organization for women who are directly descended from a patriot of the American Revolution. A non-profit and non-political group, the organization promotes historical preservation, education and patriotism. Its membership is limited to direct lineal descendants of soldiers or others of the American Revolution era who aided the revolution and its subsequent war. Applicants must be at least 18 years of age. DAR had over 190,000 members in the United States and other countries as of 2013. The organization's original motto, "Home and Country", was changed in the twentieth century to "God, Home, and Country".

== History ==
In 1889, the centennial of President George Washington's inauguration was celebrated, and Americans looked for additional ways to recognize their past. Out of the renewed interest in United States history, numerous patriotic and preservation societies were founded. On July 13, 1890, after the Sons of the American Revolution refused to allow women to join their group, Mary Smith Lockwood published the story of patriot Hannah White Arnett in The Washington Post, asking, "Where will the Sons and Daughters of the American Revolution place Hannah Thurston?" On July 21 of that year, William O. McDowell, a great-grandson of Hannah White Arnett, published an article in The Washington Post offering to help form a society to be known as the Daughters of the American Revolution. The first meeting of the society was held August 9, 1890.

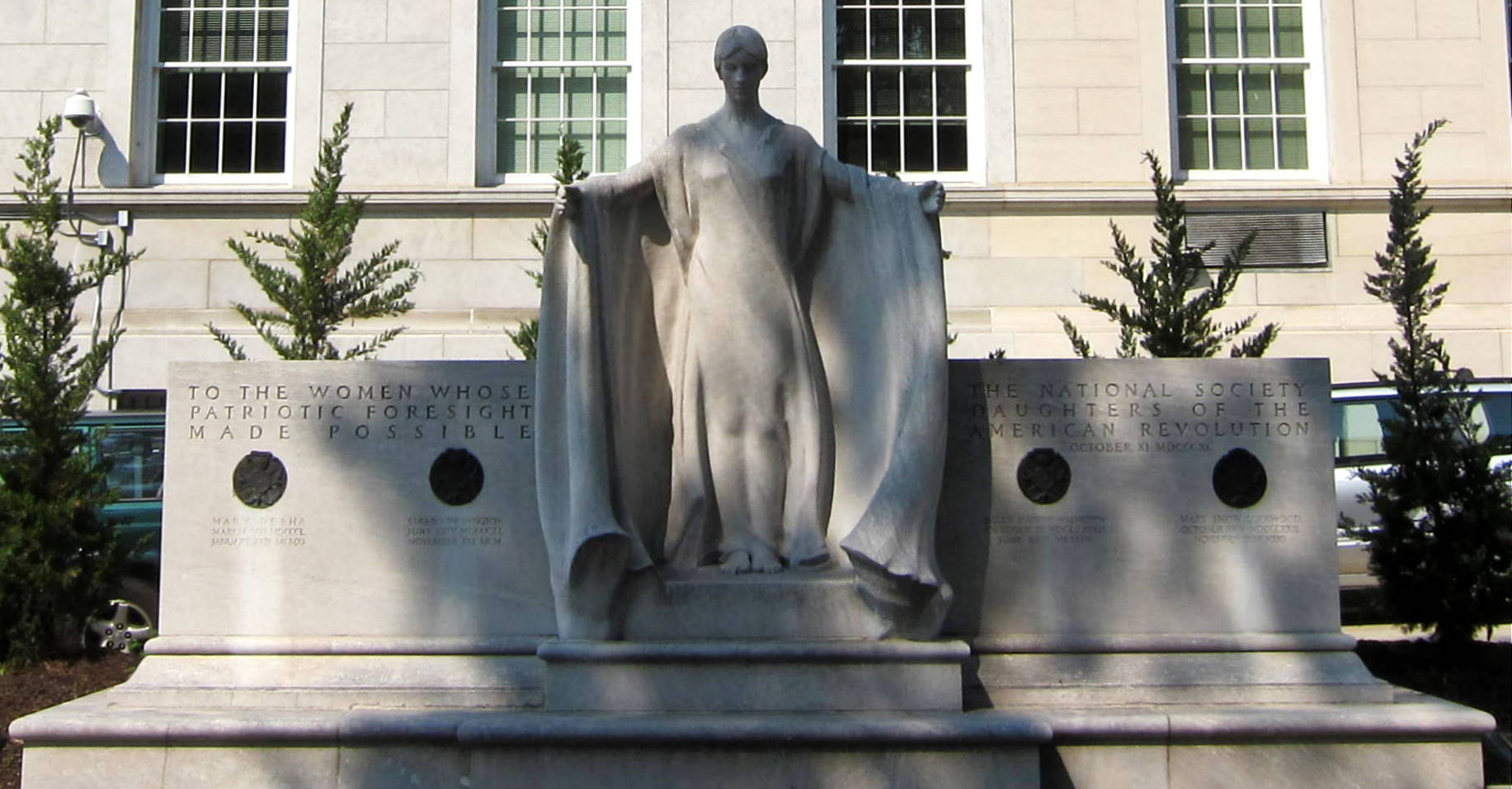
The Founders of the Daughters of the American Revolution sculpture honoring DAR's four founders

The first DAR chapter was organized on October 11, 1890, at the Strathmore Arms (810 12th Street NW), the home of Mary Smith Lockwood, one of the DAR's four co-founders. Other founders were Eugenia Washington, a great-grandniece of George Washington, Ellen Hardin Walworth, and Mary Desha. They had also held organizational meetings in August 1890. Other attendees in October were Sons of the American Revolution members Registrar General George Brown Goode, Secretary General A. Howard Clark, William O. McDowell (SAR member #1), Wilson L. Gill (secretary at the inaugural meeting), and 18 other people. Goode, who was the husband of DAR charter member Sarah Ford Judd Goode, designed the national society's official insignia.

The U.S. First Lady Caroline Lavina Scott Harrison, wife of President Benjamin Harrison, lent her prestige to the founding of DAR, and served as its first President General. Having initiated a renovation of the White House, she was interested in historic preservation. She helped establish the goals of DAR, which was incorporated by congressional charter in 1896.

On March 3, 1913, the Woman Suffrage Procession concluded with a rally at Memorial Continental Hall, the society's national headquarters, as many members of DAR were active in the women's suffrage movement.

== Structure ==
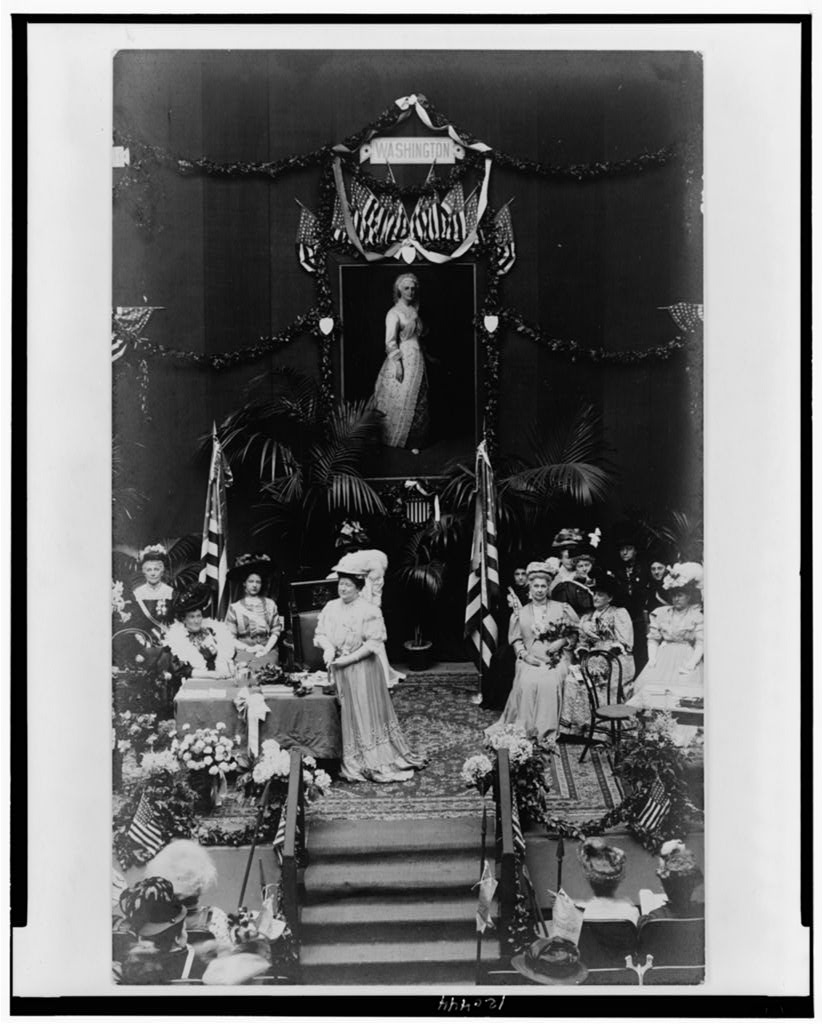
President General Emily Nelson Ritchie McLean speaks at the NSDAR Convention in 1908

DAR is structured into three Society levels: National Society, State Society, and Chapter. A State Society may be formed in any US State, the District of Columbia, or other countries that are home to at least one DAR Chapter. Chapters can be organized by a minimum of 12 members, or prospective members, who live in the same city or town.

Each Society or Chapter is overseen by an executive board composed of a variety of officers. National level officers are: President General, First Vice President General, Chaplain General, Recording Secretary General, Corresponding Secretary General, Organizing Secretary General, Treasurer General, Registrar General, Historian General, Librarian General, Curator General, and Reporter General, to be designated as Executive Officers, and twenty-one Vice Presidents General. These officers are mirrored at the State and Chapter level, with a few changes: instead of a President General, States and Chapters have Regents, the twenty-one Vice Presidents General become one Second Vice Regent position, and the title of "General" is replaced by the title of either "State" or "Chapter". Example: First Vice President General becomes State First Vice Regent.

== Finances ==
In 2024, DAR reported a revenue of $33,892,825 which after expenses left a net income for the year of $1,536,054.

== Historic programs ==
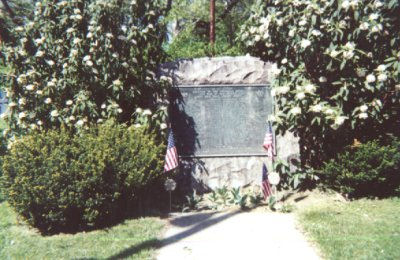
A Daughters of the American Revolution tablet erected in 1926 at Old Allentown Cemetery in Allentown, Pennsylvania honoring Allentown patriots from the American Revolution who are buried in the cemetery

The DAR chapters raised funds to initiate a number of historic preservation and patriotic endeavors. They began a practice of installing markers at the graves of Revolutionary War veterans to indicate their service, and adding small flags at their gravesites on Memorial Day.

Other activities included commissioning and installing monuments to battles and other sites related to the War. The DAR recognized women patriots' contributions as well as those of soldiers. For instance, they installed a monument at the site of a spring where Polly Hawkins Craig and other women got water to use against flaming arrows, in the defense of Bryan Station (present-day Lexington, Kentucky).

In addition to installing markers and monuments, DAR chapters have purchased, preserved, and operated historic houses and other sites associated with the war.

=== DAR Hospital Corps (Spanish–American War, 1898) ===
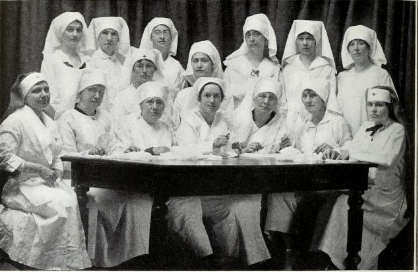
DAR members volunteering as nurses with the Red Cross

In the 19th century, the U.S. military did not have an affiliated group of nurses to treat servicemembers during wartime. At the onset of the Spanish–American War in 1898, the U.S. Army appointed physician Anita Newcomb McGee as Acting Assistant Surgeon to select educated and experienced nurses to work for the Army. As Vice President of the DAR (who also served as NSDAR's first Librarian General), McGee founded the DAR Hospital Corps to vet applicants for nursing positions. The DAR Hospital Corps certified 1,081 nurses for service during the Spanish–American War. DAR later funded pensions for many of these nurses who did not qualify for government pensions.

Some of DAR-certified nurses were trained by the American Red Cross, and many others came from religious orders such as the Sisters of Charity, Sisters of Mercy, and Sisters of the Holy Cross. These nurses served the U.S. Army in the U.S., Cuba, and the Philippines during the war. They paved the way for the eventual establishment—with McGee's assistance—of the United States Army Nurse Corps in 1901.

=== DAR state forests ===
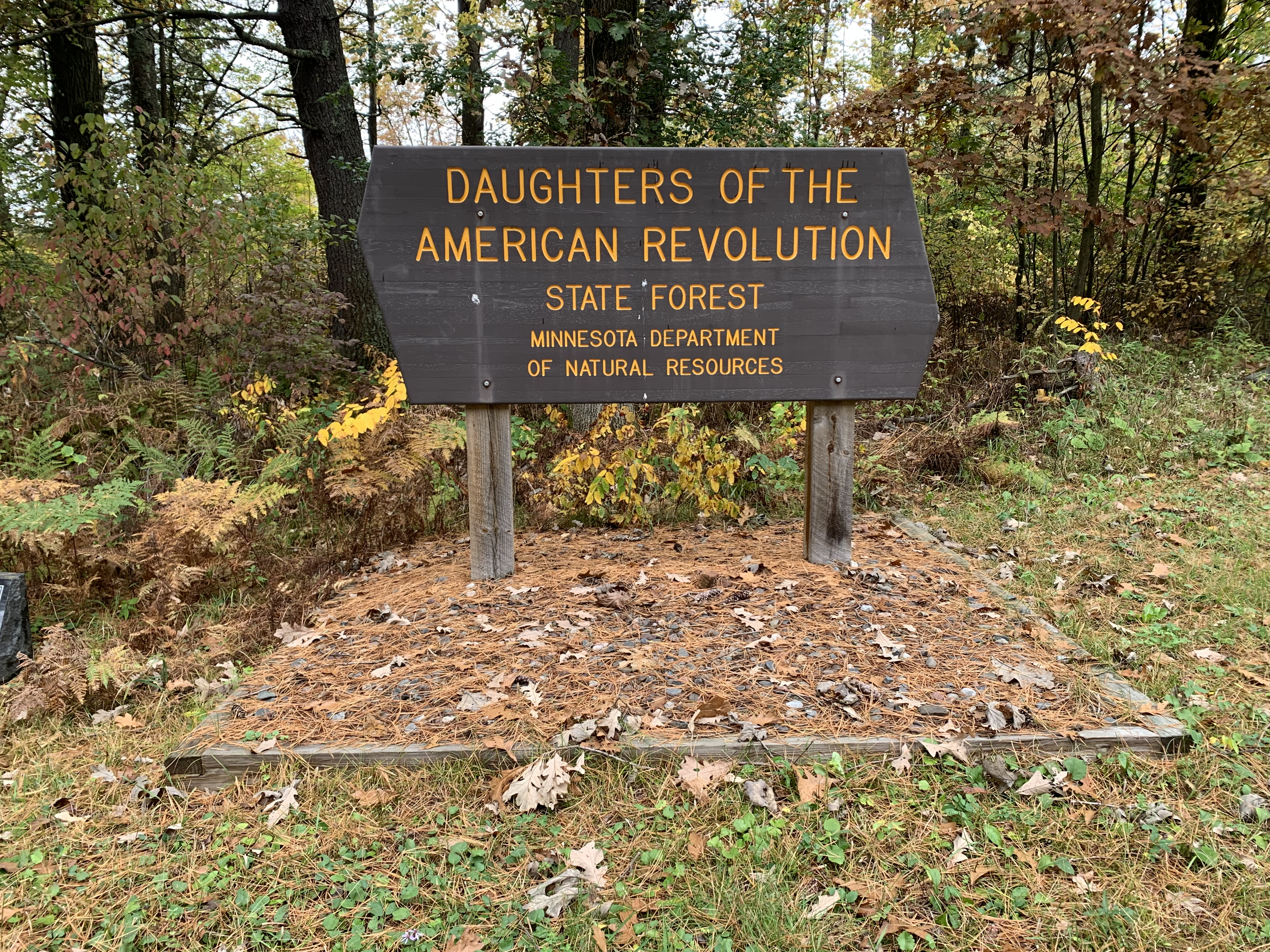
The D.A.R. State Forest in Minnesota

In 1939, President General Sarah Corbin Robert chose the Penny Pine program as a project for the national society's Golden Jubilee. Between 1939 and 1941, under the project, each U.S. state would be given a memorial state forest, with each DAR chapter pledging at least one acre of pine seedlings. The project was supervised by the United States Forestry Service and implemented by the Civilian Conservation Corps. Two of the forests include the Massachusetts D.A.R. State Forest in Ashfield and Goshen and the Minnesota D.A.R. State Forest in Pine County. Forests were also planted in Arizona, Arkansas, California, Colorado, Connecticut, Delaware, Florida, Georgia, Idaho, Illinois, Indiana, Iowa, Kentucky, Louisiana, Maryland, Michigan, Mississippi, Missouri, Nebraska, New Hampshire, New Jersey, New Mexico, New York, North Carolina, North Dakota, Ohio, Oklahoma, Oregon, Pennsylvania, South Carolina, South Dakota, Tennessee, Vermont, Virginia, Washington, West Virginia, Wisconsin, and Wyoming.

=== Textbook committees ===
During the 1950s, statewide chapters of the DAR took an interest in reviewing school textbooks for their own standards of suitability. In Texas, the statewide "Committee on Investigations of Textbooks" issued a report in 1955 identifying 59 textbooks currently in Texas public schools that had "socialistic slant" or "other deficiencies" including references to "Soviet Russia" in the Encyclopedia Britannica.

In 1959, the Mississippi chapter's "National Defense Committee" undertook a state lobbying effort that secured an amendment to state law which added "lay" members to the committee reviewing school textbooks. A DAR board member was appointed to one of the seats.

=== U.S. state flags ===
The Daughters of the American Revolution was responsible for the designs of several State flags of the United States. In 1897, the Connecticut General Assembly approved a design by Abby Day Slocomb, regent of the Anna Warner Bailey DAR Chapter, as the official Flag of Connecticut.

In 1908, the DAR appointed a committee to research and design a state flag for Missouri. The committee's chairwoman, Marie Watkins Oliver, presented a design that was adopted as the official Flag of Missouri on March 22, 1913.

In 1911, the first Flag of Oklahoma was designed by Ruth Dickinson Clement, a member of the United Daughters of the Confederacy who would later join the DAR in 1915. In 1924, the DAR sponsored a contest to replace Clement's red-colored flag design due to the increasing association of red flags with communism. A design by DAR member Louise Fluke was adopted as the official Flag of Oklahoma on April 2, 1925.

In 1909, the Washington DAR State Society campaigned to adopt an official state flag during the Alaska–Yukon–Pacific Exposition. The national society requested that the Washington State Society send a flag to be displayed in Memorial Continental Hall in 1914. As there was still no official state flag at that time, the DAR formed a committee, led by Emma Plummer Chadwick, to design one. It was adopted by the DAR in 1915 and displayed at the hall until 1916. In April 1916, Washington DAR State Regent Angie Elizabeth Burt Bowden advocated for the Washington State Legislature to adopt the design as the official state flag. It became the official Flag of Washington in 1923.

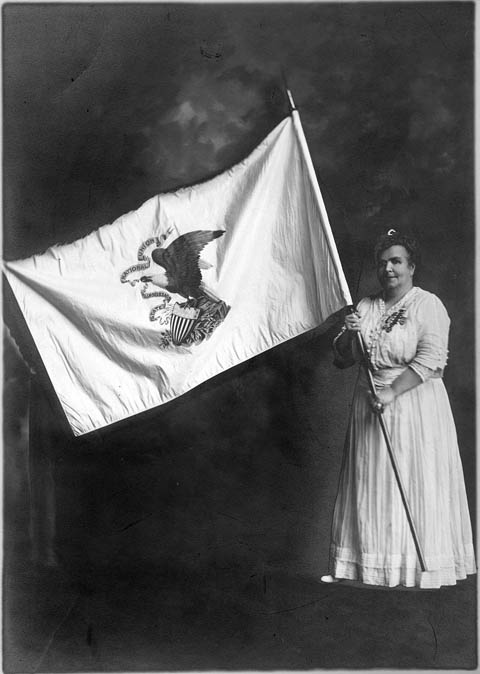
Illinois DAR State Regent Ella Park Lawrence holding the Flag of Illinois

In 1912, the Pine Bluff DAR Chapter in Arkansas held a statewide contest to design a flag. A committee appointed by the DAR to review the submissions selected a design by DAR member Willie Kavanaugh Hocker as the winner, making it the official Flag of Arkansas.

Also in 1912, the Illinois DAR State Regent, Ella Park Lawrence, launched a campaign to have Illinois adopt a state flag. No flag was created during her tenure as state regent, but she continued to lobby members of the Illinois General Assembly over the issue and, on April 1, 1914, she sent letters to every Illinois chapter of the DAR announcing a contest to design the flag. A design by Lucy Derwent was selected and became the official Flag of Illinois on July 6, 1915.

In 1916, the Wyoming DAR State Society hosted a public contest to design a state flag and had all entries sent to Wyoming DAR State Regent Grace Raymond Hebard. Verna Keays was selected as the winner, and her design became the official Flag of Wyoming on January 31, 1917.

Also in 1916, upon request by the Indiana General Assembly, the Indiana DAR State Society sponsored a contest for creation of a state flag, ultimately choosing a design submitted by Paul Hadley which was officially adopted as the Flag of Indiana on May 31, 1917.

During World War I, the Iowa DAR State Society requested the creation of a state flag. Iowa DAR State Regent Dixie Cornell Gebhardt submitted a design that was officially accepted as the Flag of Iowa on May 11, 1917.

In 1920, the New Mexico DAR called for the creation of a state flag to reflect New Mexico's heritage and culture. In 1923, a statewide contest was held and a design made by Harry Mera and Reba Mera was elected as the winner, becoming the official Flag of New Mexico in 1925.

== Contemporary DAR ==
There are nearly 190,000 current members of the DAR in approximately 3,000 chapters across the United States and in several other countries. The organization describes itself as "one of the most inclusive genealogical societies" in the United States, noting on its website that, "any woman 18 years or older—regardless of race, religion, or ethnic background—who can prove lineal descent from a patriot of the American Revolution, is eligible for membership". The current DAR President General is Ginnie Sebastian Storage, a medical practice administrator from Virginia.

=== Eligibility ===
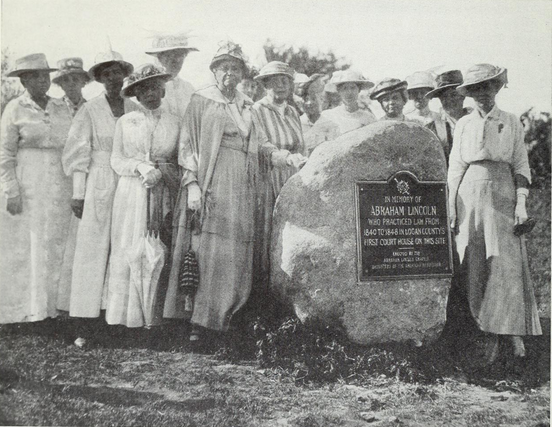
DAR members place a historical marker honoring Abraham Lincoln

Membership in the DAR today is open to all women, regardless of race or religion, who can prove lineal bloodline descent from an ancestor who aided in achieving United States independence. The National Society DAR is the final arbiter of the acceptability of the documentation of all applications for membership.

Qualifying participants in achieving independence include the following:

- Signatories of the United States Declaration of Independence;
- Military veterans of the American Revolutionary War, including State navies and militias, local militias, privateers, and French or Spanish soldiers and sailors who fought in the American theater of war to include the Island of Cuba;
- Civil servants of provisional or State governments, Continental Congress and State conventions and assemblies;
- Signers of Oath of Allegiance or Oath of Fidelity and Support;
- Participants in the Boston Tea Party or Edenton Tea Party;
- Prisoners of war, refugees, and defenders of fortresses and frontiers; doctors and nurses who aided Revolutionary casualties; ministers; petitioners; and
- Others who gave material or patriotic support to the Revolutionary cause.

DAR published a book, available online, with the names of thousands of minority patriots, to enable family and historical research. Its online Genealogical Research System (GRS) provides access to a database, and it is digitizing family Bibles to collect more information for research.

The organization has chapters in all 50 U.S. states and Washington, D.C.. DAR chapters outside the U.S. have been founded in Australia, Austria, the Bahamas, Bermuda, Canada, France, Germany, Italy, Japan, Mexico, Spain, and the United Kingdom. DAR is a governing organization within the Hereditary Society Community of the United States of America, and each DAR President General has served on HSC's board since its inception.

=== Educational programs ===
DAR says that they contribute over $1 million annually to support five schools that provide for a variety of special student needs. The five supported schools are:

- Berry College in Mount Berry, Georgia
- Crossnore School in Crossnore, North Carolina
- Kate Duncan Smith DAR School in Grant, Alabama
- Hillside School in Marlborough, Massachusetts
- Hindman Settlement School in Hindman, Kentucky

Scholarships and funds are given to Native American youth at Chemawa Indian School in Salem, Oregon and Bacone College in Muskogee, Oklahoma.

=== Civic work ===
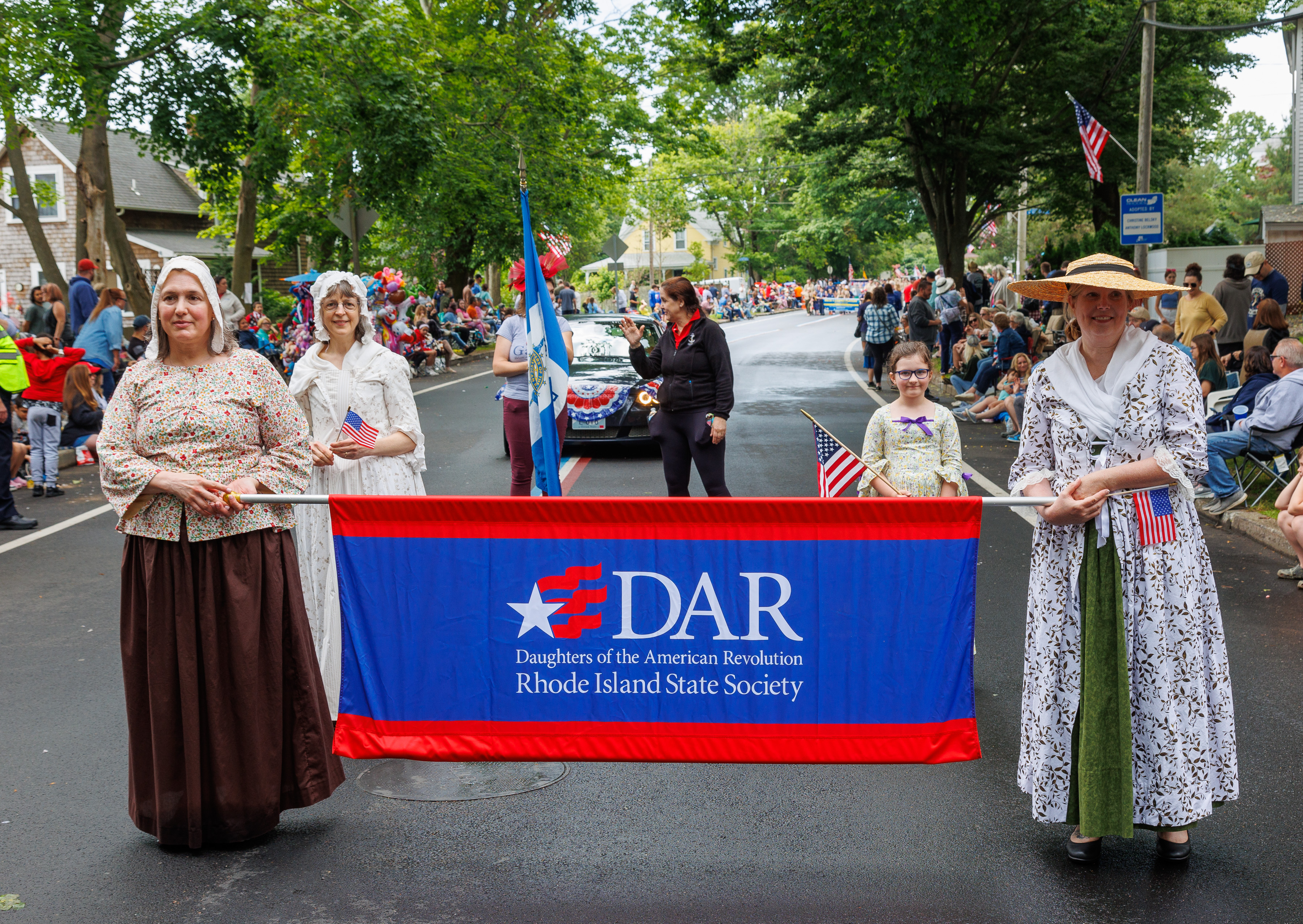
Rhode Island's DAR state society at the 2023 Gaspee Days Parade in Pawtuxet Village

DAR members participate in a variety of veteran and citizenship-oriented projects, including:

- Providing more than 200,000 hours of volunteer time annually to veterans in U.S. Veterans Administration hospitals and non-VA facilities
- Offering support to America's service personnel in current conflicts abroad through care packages, phone cards and other needed items
- Sponsoring special programs promoting the Constitution during its official celebration week of September 17–23
- Participating in naturalization ceremonies

=== Exhibits and library at DAR headquarters ===
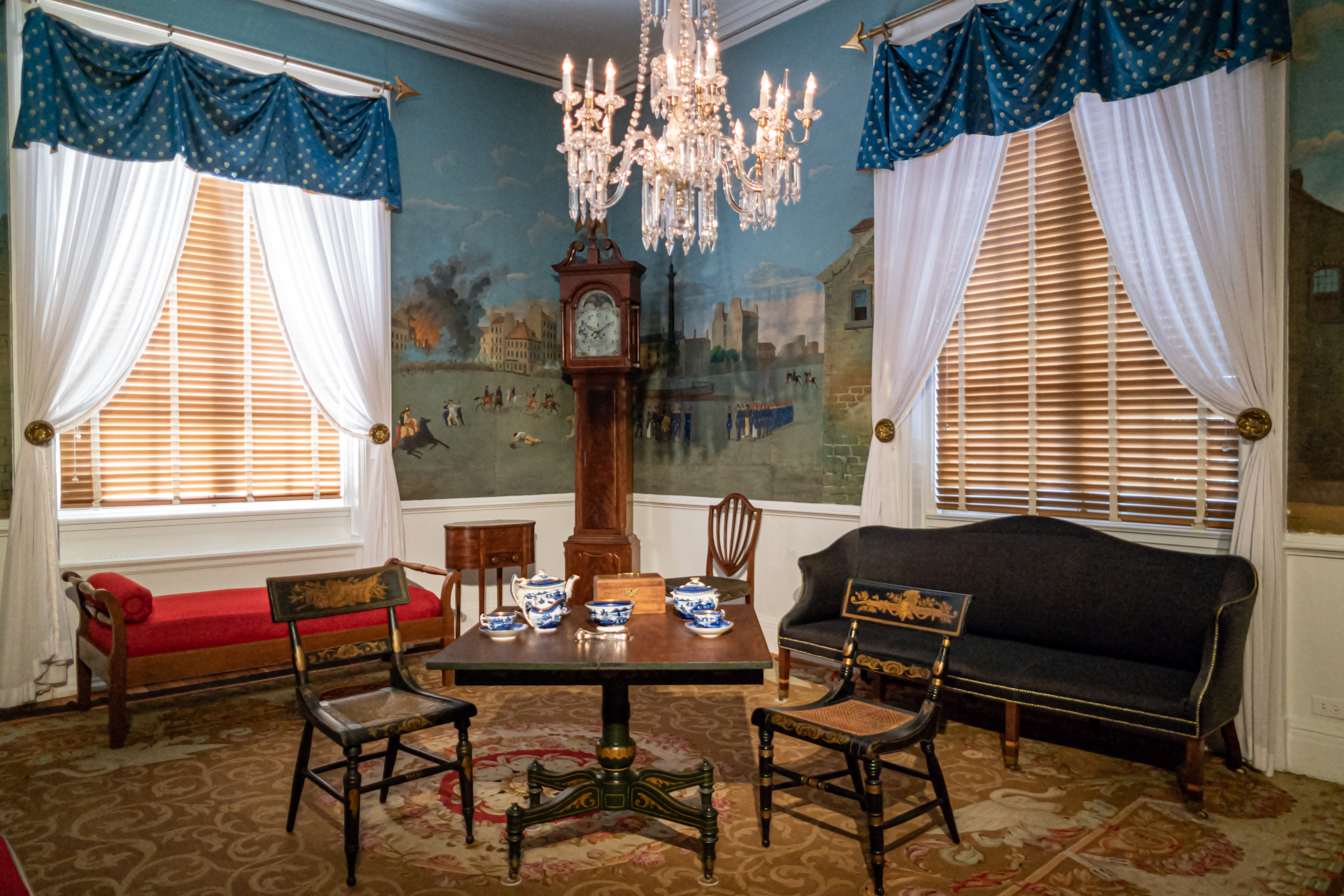
One of the period rooms in the DAR Museum in Washington, D.C.

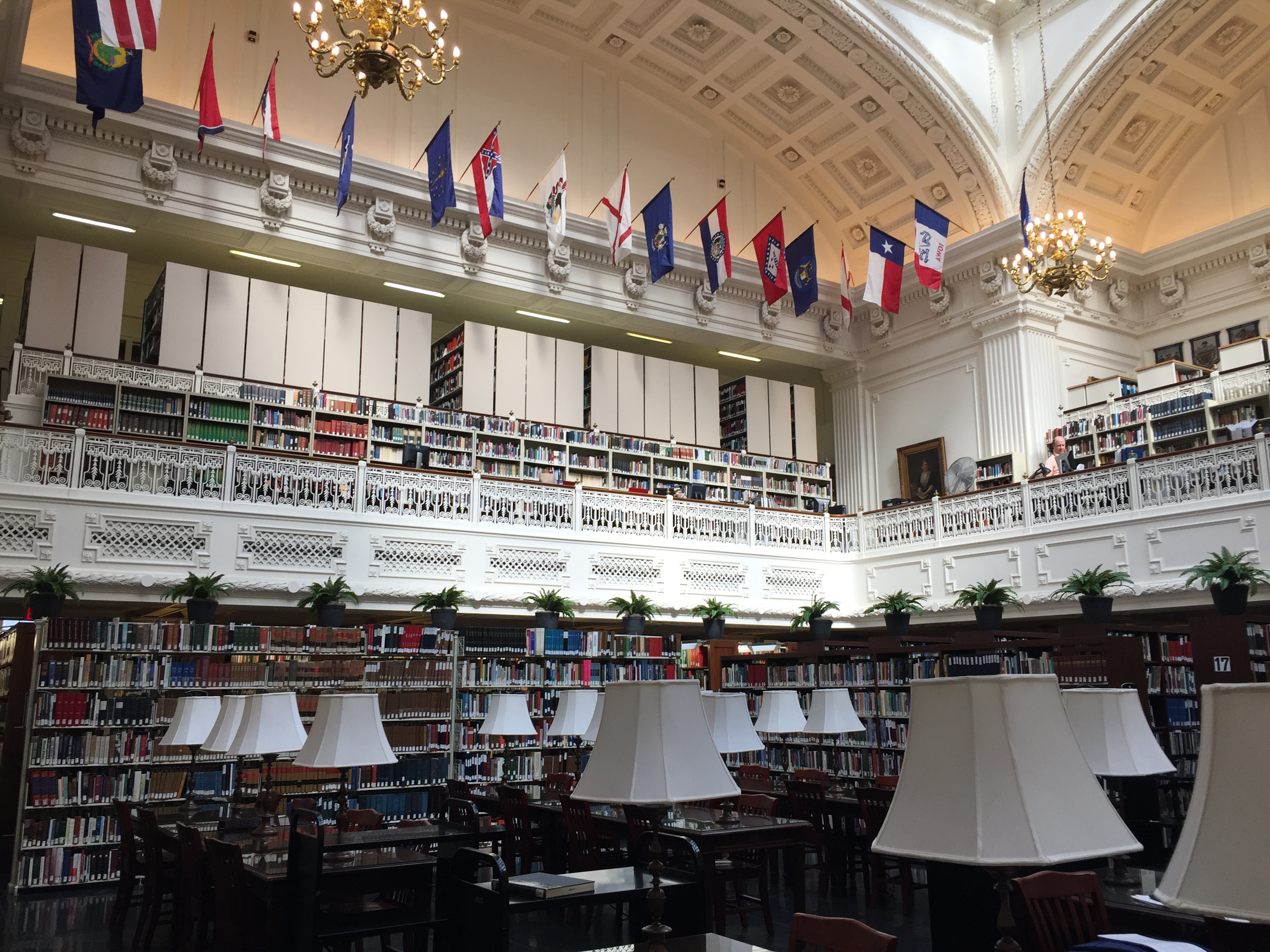
The DAR Library in Washington, D.C.

DAR maintains a genealogical library at its headquarters in Washington, D.C., which provides guides for individuals doing family research. Its bookstore presents scholarship on United States and women's history.

Temporary exhibits in the galleries have featured women's arts and crafts, including items from the DAR's quilt and embroidery collections. Exhibit curators provide a social and historical context for girls' and women's arts in such exhibits, for instance, explaining practices of mourning reflected in certain kinds of embroidery samplers, as well as ideals expressed about the new republic. Permanent exhibits include American furniture, silver, and furnishings.

The DAR, together with the American Battlefield Trust created "The American Revolution Experience" traveling exhibit to mark the America 250 commemoration.

The DAR Museum exhibition, "The Revolution in Their Words", opened 27 March 2026. It includes first hand accounts about the DAR founding and provides perspectives from free and enslaved Black people, women, soldiers, Native Americans and ordinary people.

=== Literacy promotion ===
In 1989, the DAR established the NSDAR Literacy Promotion Committee, which coordinates the efforts of DAR volunteers to promote child and adult literacy. Volunteers teach English, tutor reading, prepare students for GED examinations, raise funds for literacy programs, and participate in many other ways.

=== American history essay contest ===
DAR holds an annual national American history essay contest for students in 5th through 8th grades. A different topic is selected each year. Essays are judged "for historical accuracy, adherence to topic, organization of materials, interest, originality, spelling, grammar, punctuation, and neatness". The contest is conducted locally by DAR chapters. Chapter winners compete against each other by region and nationally; national winners receive a monetary award.

=== Scholarships ===
DAR awards $150,000 annually in scholarships to high school graduates, and music, law, nursing, and medical school students. Only two of the 20 scholarships offered are restricted to DAR members or their descendants. In 2026, DAR awarded an additional 10 scholarships, the DAR America 250! Scholarships, for American history students in the amount of $25,000.

=== Grants ===
In April 2026, the DAR announced that it would provide $650,000 in grants and donations for women veteran causes including the Vivian Outreach for Women Grant for organizations that support the homeless and indigent women veterans and the Military Women's Memorial (MWM) which received a $250,000 gift.

=== Debutante balls and presentations ===
Certain chapters of the DAR partner with the Sons of the American Revolution to host debutante balls where daughters of members are presented to society as debutantes and sons of members are presented as "patriots". Junior Members of the DAR and members of the Children of the American Revolution may also be presented. The Pennsylvania State Society of the DAR hosts the annual Constitution Debutante Ball in Valley Forge. In Lafayette, Louisiana, the Galvez Chapter of the DAR hosts the annual George Washington Ball, commemorating the birthday of George Washington. Young women in the Children of the American Revolution who are either eighteen years of age or a senior in high school may be presented as debutantes at the Virginia DAR State Conference in Richmond. Debutantes are also presented at the Georgia DAR State Conference.

== Diversity and inclusion ==
=== African Americans ===
On December 3, 1896, Eunice Russ Ames Davis, a multiracial abolitionist and founding member of the Boston Female Anti-Slavery Society, joined the Old South Chapter of the Daughters of the American Revolution in Boston, Massachusetts. She was of African, Narragansett Indian, Penobscot, and European ancestry and the daughter of American revolutionary Prince Ames. She was presented with a gold spoon by the DAR, as a "Real Daughter of the Revolution", on her 97th birthday.

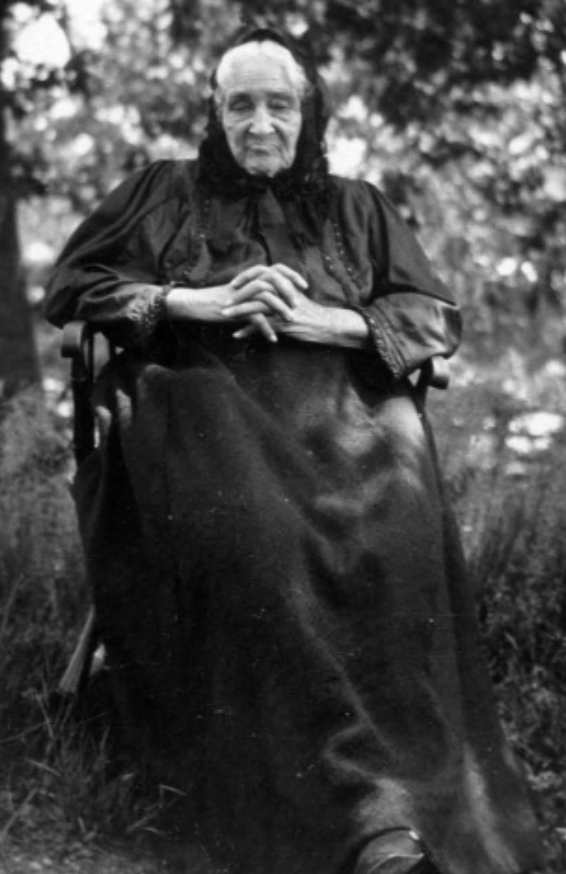
Eunice Russ Ames Davis, an abolitionist and the first-known woman of color to join the DAR

In 1932, DAR adopted a rule excluding African American musicians from performing at DAR Constitution Hall in response to complaints by some members against "mixed seating", as both black and white people were attracted to concerts of black artists. This was during the time when Washington, D.C., was a racially segregated city. In 1939, they denied permission for Marian Anderson to perform a concert at the hall. First Lady Eleanor Roosevelt, a DAR member, resigned from the organization in protest. In her letter to the DAR, Roosevelt wrote, "I am in complete disagreement with the attitude taken in refusing Constitution Hall to a great artist...You had an opportunity to lead in an enlightened way and it seems to me that your organization has failed." African-American author Zora Neale Hurston criticized Roosevelt's refusal to condemn the simultaneous decision by the city's Board of Education to exclude Anderson from singing at the segregated white Central High School. Hurston declared "to jump the people responsible for racial bias would be to accuse and expose the accusers themselves. The District of Columbia has no home rule; it is controlled by congressional committees, and Congress at the time was overwhelmingly Democratic. It was controlled by the very people who were screaming so loudly against the DAR. To my way of thinking, both places should have been denounced, or neither."

As the controversy grew, American media overwhelmingly backed Anderson's right to sing. The Philadelphia Tribune, an African American newspaper in Philadelphia, wrote, "A group of tottering old ladies, who don't know the difference between patriotism and putridism, have compelled the gracious First Lady to apologize for their national rudeness." The Richmond Times-Dispatch wrote, "In these days of racial intolerance so crudely expressed in the Third Reich, an action such as the D.A.R.'s ban ... seems all the more deplorable". At Eleanor Roosevelt's behest, President Roosevelt and Walter White, then-executive secretary of the NAACP, and Anderson's manager, impresario Sol Hurok arranged an open-air concert on the steps of the Lincoln Memorial with a dignified and stirring rendition of "America (My Country, 'Tis of Thee)". The event attracted a crowd of more than 75,000 in addition to a national radio audience of millions.

The DAR later apologized to Anderson, and she went on to perform at DAR Constitution Hall in 1943 and on several subsequent occasions. Eleanor Roosevelt returned to the Hall to watch Anderson perform on January 7, 1943. In 1945, the DAR refused to allow jazz pianist Hazel Scott, wife of Adam C. Powell, a congressman from New York, to play a concert.

In 1952, DAR officially reversed its "white performers only" policy.

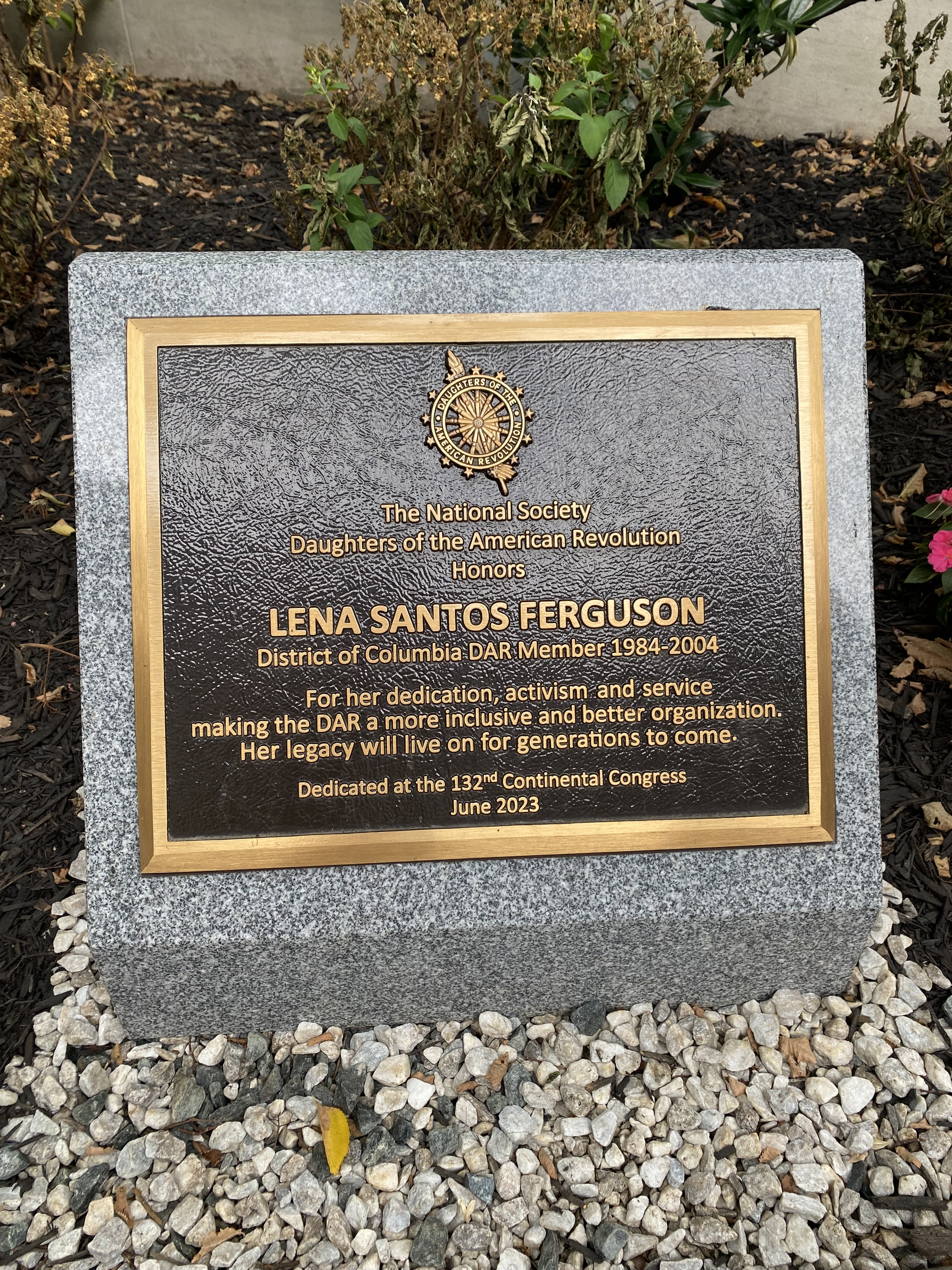
Commemorative plaque honoring Lena Santos Ferguson at DAR Constitution Hall

In 1977, Karen Batchelor Farmer (now Karen Batchelor) from Detroit, was admitted to the Ezra Parker Chapter in Royal Oak, Michigan, as the first known DAR African American member. Batchelor's admission as the first known African American member of DAR sparked international interest after it was featured in a story on page one of The New York Times.

In 1984, Lena Lorraine Santos Ferguson, a retired school secretary, was denied membership in a Washington, D.C., chapter of the DAR because she was Black, according to a report by The Washington Post. Ferguson met the lineage requirements and could trace her ancestry to Jonah Gay, a white man who fought in Maine. Sarah McKelley King, the President General of the DAR, told the Post that DAR's chapters have autonomy in determining members, saying, "Being black is not the only reason why some people have not been accepted into chapters. There are other reasons: divorce, spite, neighbors' dislike. I would say being black is very far down the line....There are a lot of people who are troublemakers. You wouldn't want them in there because they could cause some problems." After King's comments were reported in a page one story, outrage erupted, and the City Council threatened to revoke the DAR's real estate tax exemption. King quickly qualified her comments, saying that Ferguson should have been admitted, and that her application had been handled "inappropriately". DAR changed its bylaws to bar discrimination "on the basis of race or creed". In addition, King announced a resolution to recognize "the heroic contributions of black patriots in the American Revolution".

Since the mid-1980s, the DAR has supported a project to identify African Americans, Native Americans, and individuals of mixed race who were patriots of the American Revolution, expanding their recognition beyond soldiers.

In 2004, Maria Williams-Cole and Arleathia Carter Williams became the first two African-American members of the DAR in Prince George's County, Maryland.

In 2008, DAR published Forgotten Patriots: African-American and American Indian Patriots in the Revolutionary War. In 2007, the DAR posthumously honored Mary Hemings Bell, an individual enslaved by Thomas Jefferson, as a "Patriot of the Revolution". Because of Hemings Bell's declaration by the DAR to be a Patriot, all of her female descendants qualify for membership in the DAR.

In 2018, Reisha Raney became the first black woman elected to serve as a DAR state officer in Maryland. She previously served on the national level of the organization as the vice chairwoman of the membership committee division. Raney founded Daughter Dialogues, a podcast documenting the narratives of black members of the DAR, which launched on July 1, 2021. In September 2018, Sonja Addison, Stephannie Addison-Mudd, and Brooke Addison Moore became the first African-American members of the Fauquier Court House Chapter of the DAR in Fauquier County, Virginia.

In June 2019, Wilhelmena Rhodes Kelly became the first African American elected to the DAR National Board of Management when she was installed as New York State Regent.

In 2022, Sheryl Sims became the first African-American woman to join the Nelly Custis Chapter of the DAR in Alexandria, Virginia. In September 2022, Sharon Fort became the first African-American woman to join the DAR in Arkansas. In December 2022, DAR donated $150,000 to the Marian Anderson Museum to help with restoration costs following flood damage to the building in 2020.

In October 2023, Johnette Gordon-Weaver became the first African-American member of the Williamsburg chapter of the DAR. Gordon Weaver is a descendant of Anthony Roberts, the first free African-American patriot recognized by the organization at the national level. In 2024, Regina Lynch-Hudson became the first woman of color to join the Greenlee Chapter of the DAR in Old Fort, North Carolina, and the first black female descendent of Colonel John Carson to join the national society.

On June 28, 2025, the DAR presented the DAR Media and Entertainment Award to Tyler Perry Studios for the war drama film The Six Triple Eight, based on the predominantly-Black 6888th Central Postal Directory Battalion of the Women's Army Corps during World War II.

=== Jews ===
As the DAR does not discriminate based on race, ethnicity, or religion, Jewish women may join the organization. The DAR keeps a record in their archives of Jewish patriots of the American Revolution, including Solomon Bush, David Emanuel, Myer Myers, Abigail Minis, Benjamin Nones, Jonas Phillips, Haym Salomon, Gershom Mendes Seixas, and Mordecai Sheftall.

During the New Jersey DAR State Conference in 1954, Marian Estelle Melson Strack of Locust, New Jersey made anti-semitic remarks during her speech, calling kosher markings on canned and packaged goods "clandestine" and claiming that they were evidence of "how a bold minority can impose its will and even its religious observances on an apathetic majority". A spokesperson for the DAR responded to questions by stating that the organization is a non-partisan, non-sectarian organization and "cannot possibly support as a matter of national policy any attack upon any other group of Americans by reason of their race, creed or color". Seven out of nine members of the New Jersey DAR's board of governors denounced Strack's comments and held New Jersey State Regent Mrs. Thomas Reeves responsible for the speech. Reeves accepted responsibility for allowing Strack to speak and stated that she had no prior knowledge of the contents of the speech. A fellow DAR member, Mrs. Thomas E. Lynn, condemned Strack's speech, saying that America "promises liberty and justice to all" and that she, as a Christian who believes in the "tenets of brotherly love" and as an American citizen, protests "sponsorship of a speaker who rejects all these ideals".

In 1957, guest speaker Rear Admiral John G. Crommelin made anti-semitic remarks at a DAR event in Pensacola, Florida, prompting members of the organization to walk out. President General Allene Wilson Groves spoke out against persecution of minorities following the incident.

During the administration of President General Patricia Walton Shelby in the 1980s, the DAR Museum exhibited "The Jewish Community in Early America, 1654-1850", showing a collection on loan from John Loeb. Former president Gerald Ford attended the exhibit's opening.

=== Transgender women ===
In June 2023, at the 132nd DAR Continental Congress, the organization voted to add an amendment to their bylaws that states the chapters "may not discriminate against an eligible applicant based on race, religion, sexual orientation, national origin, age, disability, or any other characteristic protected by applicable law". DAR spokesperson Bren Landon told Newsweek that the amendment "provides additional non-discrimination language" that protects the society's tax-exempt status. She also told Newsweek that "the new language does not change the criteria for membership," and that "DAR's longstanding membership policy remains unchanged since our founding in 1890."

At Continental Congress, Jennifer Mease, a delegate and Regent of the Liberty Bell Chapter in Pennsylvania, inquired whether chapters could vote against admitting a new member "whose birth certificate has been altered by their state to indicate they are female even though they were born a male". President General Wright responded to Mease's inquiry by stating "if a person's certified birth certificate states 'female,' they are eligible for membership, and your chapter cannot change that" and "if their birth certificate says they are a female, and you vote against them based on their protected class, it's discrimination." In an official newsletter released after the congress, Wright wrote, "some have asked if this means a transgender woman can join DAR or if this means that DAR chapters have previously welcomed transgender women. The answer to both questions is, yes." A retired United States Air Force colonel named Teagan Livingston, who is a transgender woman, joined the Daughters of the American Revolution in New Jersey in 2022.

Following the 132nd Continental Congress, a small percentage of members resigned from the organization. A group within the DAR, self-proclaimed as the "Daughters Advocating for Restoration", began lobbying to ban transgender women from the organization. The movement received media attention from right-wing news outlets and publications. Another group formed on Facebook in response, the "Daughters for Inclusivity", advocating for continued efforts to diversify the DAR. In February 2025, the DAR's National Board of Management rejected the Daughters Advocating for Restoration's first proposal to reject trans women from the organization. The matter was then brought to a vote by the elected delegates within the organization at the 135th DAR Continental Congress. On June 26, 2026, the DAR voted to reject the Daughters Advocating for Restoration's proposed ban on transgender members, with 981 delegates voting in support of the ban and 1,474 delegates voting against it.

In response to the delegates' vote on June 26, 2026, Republican Congressman Ben Cline of Virginia introduced the Daughters of American Revolution Membership Integrity Act to the U.S. House of Representatives on July 15, 2026. The proposed legislation would restrict the DAR's federal charter to only permit membership to women "who naturally has, had, will have, or would have but for a congenital anomaly or intentional or unintentional disruption, the reproductive system that produces, transports, and utilizes the large gamete (ova) for fertilization." On July 28, 2026, Republican Senator Marsha Blackburn of Tennessee introduced a similar bill in the U.S. Senate, that would amend the organization's federal charter to require that members be "biological women".

On October 10, 2026, the DAR National Board of Management voted to disband the Martha Laird DAR Chapter in Texas following an investigation into the chapter's misuse of DAR leadership positions, communications, and governance processes to further the goals of the Daughters Advocating for Restoration, a separate advocacy organization, which was in violation of the DAR's bylaws. A letter to chapter members said the chapter's actions had "been found in violation of Article XIX, Section 4 of the Bylaws of the National Society Daughters of the American Revolution".

== Notable members ==
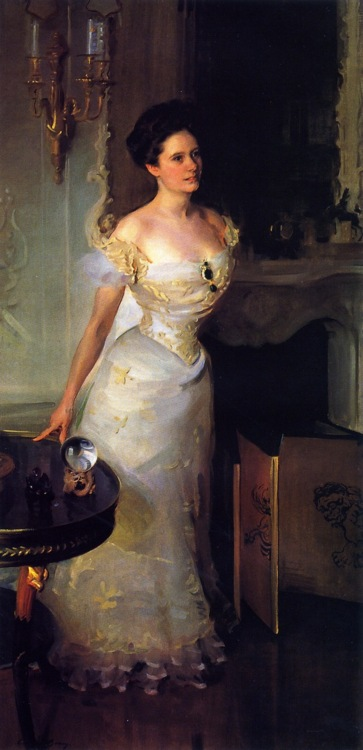
American heiress, author, and socialite Isabel Weld Perkins was a member of DAR

Since its founding, many notable women have been members of the Daughters of the American Revolution. Seven First Ladies of the United States were members of the DAR: Caroline Harrison, Julia Grant, Sarah Childress Polk, Eleanor Roosevelt, Rosalynn Carter, Barbara Bush, and Laura Bush. Three Second Ladies of the United States have also been members, including Letitia Stevenson and Cornelia Cole Fairbanks. Foreign royals and nobles have also had membership in the DAR including Infanta Eulalia of Spain, Princess Julia Grant Cantacuzène-Speransky, Virginie de Pusy Lafayette, and Marie Laurence de Rochefort. Other notable public figures and federal-level politicians include U.S. Senators Tammy Duckworth, Elizabeth Dole, Rebecca Latimer Felton, and Margaret Chase Smith, U.S. Congresswomen Alice Robertson and Katherine G. Langley, U.S. Secretary of Homeland Security Kristi Noem, U.S. Court of International Trade Judge Kara Westercamp, and U.S. District Court judge Ada Brown. Prominent state politicians and public officials have also been members of the DAR, including Kentucky Governor Martha Layne Collins, Alabama Governor Kay Ivey, and Arkansas Governor Sarah Huckabee Sanders, Illinois state representative Sarah Bond Hanley, West Virginia state representative Mary Martha Presley Merritt, Washington state representative Gene Bradford, Iowan first lady Anna Matilda Larrabee, Tennessee first lady Elizabeth Childress Brown, Kentucky Second Lady and Department of Veterans Affairs Commissioner Heather French Henry, Kentucky Treasurer and Secretary of State Emma Guy Cromwell, Texas Democratic Committeewoman Birdie Robertson Johnson, Illinois first lady MK Pritzker, Mississippi First Lady Alice Josephine Tye Noel, and North Carolinian first ladies Mary McKinley Daves Ellis, Fanny Yarborough Bickett, Alice Willson Broughton, Mildred Stafford Cherry, Eleanor Kearny Carr, and Margaret Gardner Hoey. Other notable DAR members include officers in the U.S. Armed Forces, such as Brigadier General Wilma Vaught, Rear Admiral Grace Hopper, Rear Admiral Donna L. Crisp, Colonel Westray Battle Long, Command Chief Warrant Officer Phyllis J. Wilson, and Major Almyra Maynard Watson, and prominent entertainers such as the actresses Ginger Rogers, Lillian Gish, and Bo Derek and the singer Rosanne Cash.

== List of DAR presidents general ==
The presidents general of the society have been:

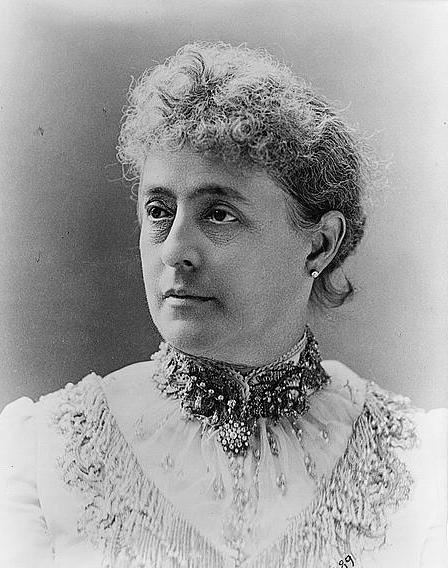
Caroline Scott Harrison, First DAR President General

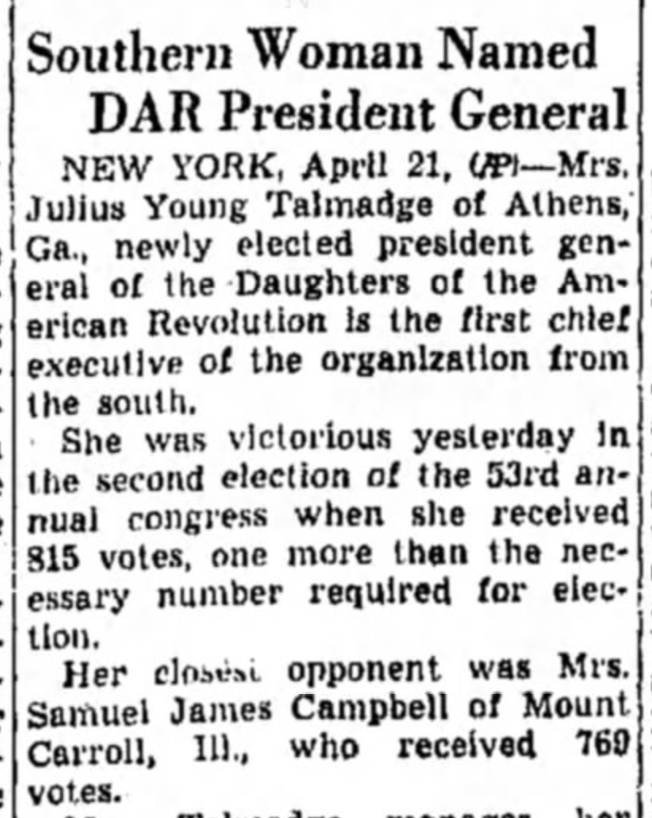
Mrs. Julius Young Talmadge Named DAR President General

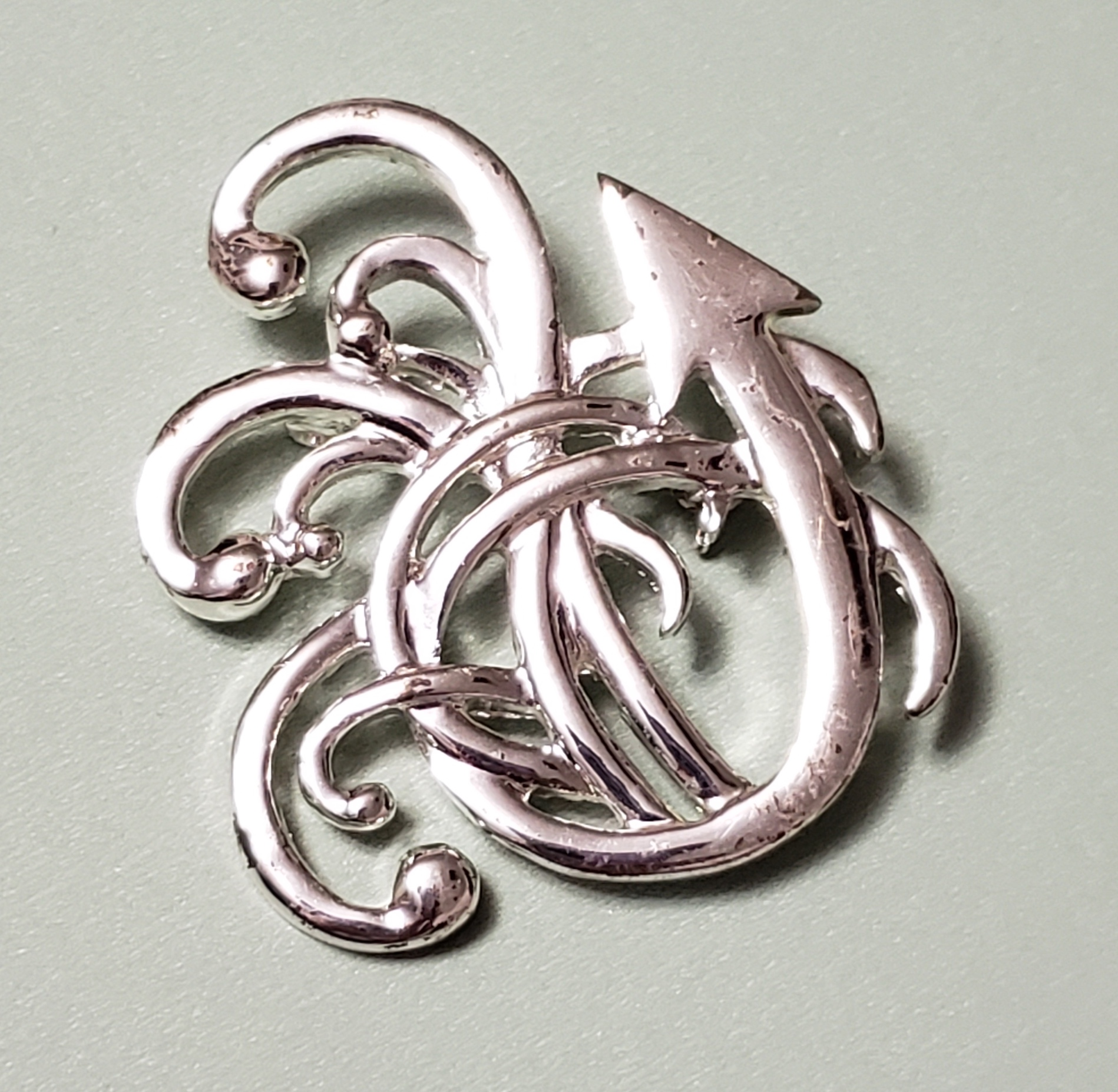
Silver Arrow, the symbol of the Dillon administration in the form of a pin

Number	President General	Years in office	State of membership
1	Caroline Scott Harrison, (Mrs. Benjamin)	1890–1892, Died in office	Indiana
1.5	Mary Virginia Ellet Cabell, (Mrs. William D.)	1892–1893, Vice President Presiding	Virginia
2	Letitia Green Stevenson, (Mrs. Adlai E.)	1893–1895	Illinois
3	Mary Parke McFerson Foster, (Mrs. John W.)	1895–1896	Indiana
4	Letitia Green Stevenson, (Mrs. Adlai E.)	1896–1898	Illinois
5	Mary Margaretta Fryer Manning, (Mrs. Daniel)	1898–1899, & 1899–1901	New York
6	Cornelia Cole Fairbanks, (Mrs. Charles W.)	1901–1903 & 1903–1905	Indiana
7	Emily Nelson Ritchie McLean, (Mrs. Donald)	1905–1907 & 1907–1909	New York
8	Julia Green Scott, (Mrs. Matthew T.)	1909–1911 & 1911–1913	Illinois
9	Daisy Allen Story, (Mrs. William Cumming)	1913–1915 & 1915–1917	New York
10	Sarah Elizabeth Mitchell Guernsey, (Mrs. George Thatcher)	1917–1920	Kansas
11	Anne Belle Rogers Minor, (Mrs. George Maynard)	1920–1923	Connecticut
12	Lora Haines Cook, (Mrs. Anthony Wayne)	1923–1926	Pennsylvania
13	Grace Lincoln Brosseau, (Mrs. Hall)	1926–1929	Connecticut
14	Edith Irwin Hobart, (Mrs. Lowell Fletcher)	1929–1932	Ohio
15	Edith Scott Magna, (Mrs. Russell William)	1932–1935	Massachusetts
16	Florence Hague Becker, (Mrs. William A.)	1935–1938	New Jersey
17	Sarah Corbin Robert, (Mrs. Henry Martyn Jr.)	1938–1941	Maryland
18	Helena R. Pouch, (Mrs. William H.)	1941–1944	New York
19	May Erwin Talmadge, (Mrs. Julius Young)	1944–1947	Georgia
20	Estella Armstrong O'Byrne, (Mrs. Roscoe C.)	1947–1950	Indiana
21	Marguerite Courtright Patton, (Mrs. James B.)	1950–1953	Ohio
22	Gertrude Sprague Carraway	1953–1956	North Carolina
23	Allene Wilson Groves, (Mrs. Frederic A.)	1956–1959	Missouri
24	Doris Pike White, (Mrs. Ashmead)	1959–1962	Maine
25	Marion Moncure Duncan, (Mrs. Robert V. H.)	1962–1965	Virginia
26	Adele Woodhouse Erb Sullivan, (Mrs. William Henry Jr.)	1965–1968	New York
27	Betty Newkirk Seimes, (Mrs. Erwin Frees)	1968–1971	Delaware
28	Eleanor Washington Spicer, (Mrs. Donald)	1971–1974	California
29	Sara Roddis Jones, (Mrs. Henry Stewart)	1974–1975	Wisconsin
30	Jane Farwell Smith, (Mrs. Wakelee Rawson)	1975–1977	Illinois
31	Jeannette Osborn Baylies, (Mrs. George Upham)	1977–1980	New York
32	Patricia Walton Shelby, (Mrs. Richard Denny)	1980–1983	Mississippi
33	Sarah McKelley King, (Mrs. Walter Hughey)	1983–1986	Tennessee
34	Ann Davison Duffie Fleck, (Mrs. Raymond Franklin)	1986–1989	Massachusetts
35	Marie Hirst Yochim, (Mrs. Eldred Martin)	1989–1992	Virginia
36	Wayne Garrison Blair, (Mrs. Donald Shattuck)	1992–1995	Ohio
37	Dorla Eaton Kemper, (Mrs. Charles Keil)	1995–1998	California
38	Georgane Ferguson Love (Easley), (Mrs. Dale Kelly)	1998–2001	Mississippi
39	Linda Tinker Watkins*	2001–2004	Tennessee
40	Presley Merritt Wagoner	2004–2007	West Virginia
41	Linda Gist Calvin	2007–2010	California
42	Merry Ann T. Wright	2010–2013	New York
43	Lynn Forney Young	2013–2016	Texas
44	Ann Turner Dillon	2016–2019	Colorado
45	Denise Doring VanBuren	2019–2022	New York
46	Pamela Rouse Wright	2022–2025	Texas
47	Ginnie Sebastian Storage	2025–present	Virginia

*Note: During the Watkins administration, the President General and other National Officers began to be referred to by their own first names, rather than their husbands'.

== Honors ==
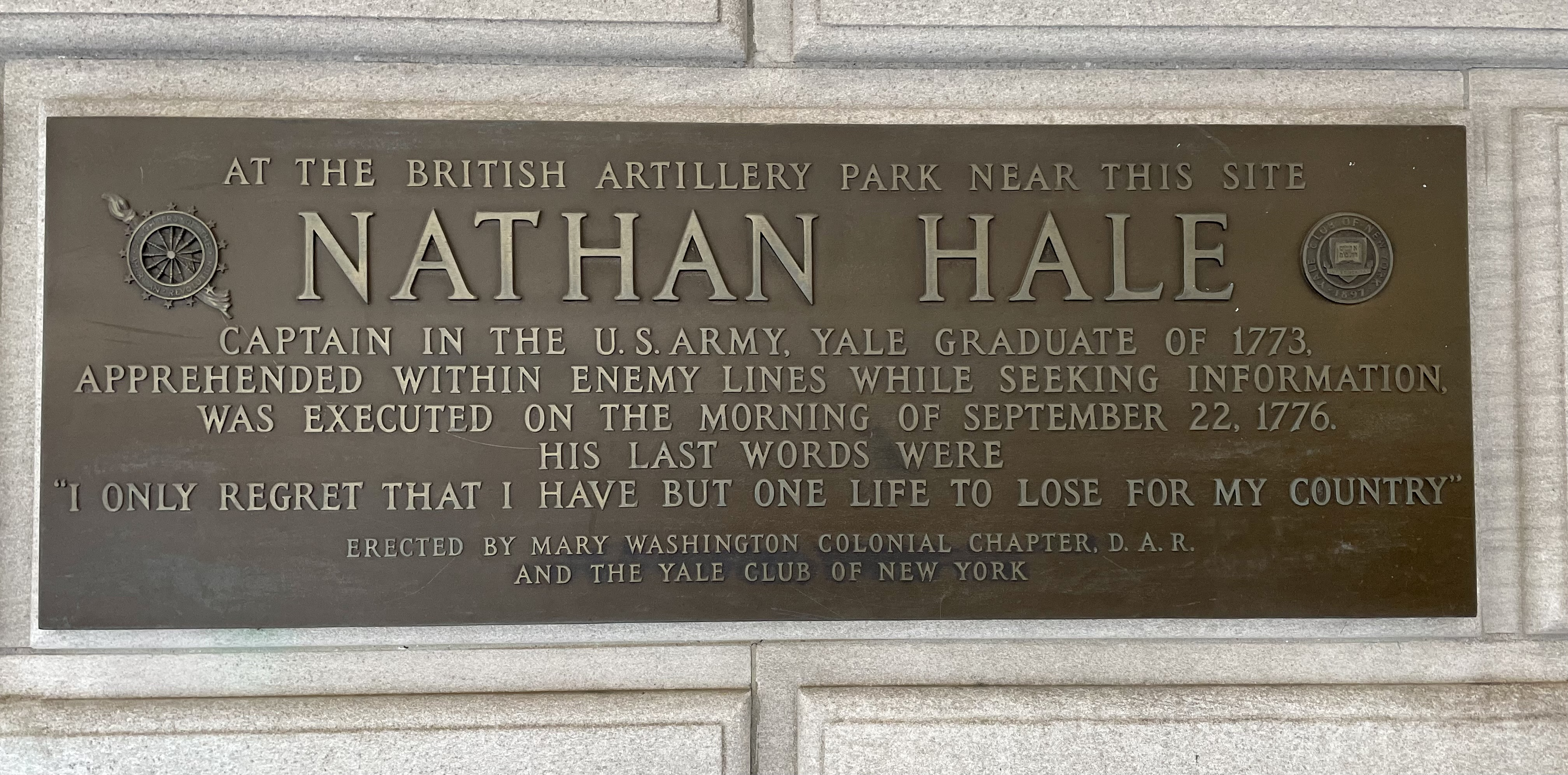
Yale Club plaque

A memorial to the Daughters of the American Revolution's four founders at Constitution Hall in Washington, D.C., was dedicated on April 17, 1929. It was sculpted by Gertrude Vanderbilt Whitney, a DAR member.

== In popular culture ==
In 1932, American artist Grant Wood painted the satirical painting Daughters of Revolution after a local chapter of the DAR complained about his use of German glass in a commission he created for a veterans memorial.

In 1963, fashion photographer Richard Avedon photographed the executive officers of the Daughters of the American Revolution during their convention at the Mayflower Hotel in Washington, D.C. The portrait, titled The Generals of the Daughters of the American Revolution, is now part of the collection of the National Museum of American History. A print of the image hanging at an inn in Minneapolis was shot at on November 11, 1986, becoming a popular tourist attraction. The American indie pop band The Mynabirds used the portrait as inspiration for their 2012 album Generals.

In 'V' for Vitamins, the 30th episode of the second season of American sitcom Gilligan's Island, the character Lovey Howell (portrayed by Natalie Schafer) states that she is a member of the DAR.

In the American comedy-drama television series Gilmore Girls, the character Emily Gilmore (portrayed by Kelly Bishop) is a regent of a chapter of the Daughters of the American Revolution. Her granddaughter, Rory Gilmore (portrayed by Alexis Bledel), is presented to society at a DAR debutante ball and later joins and works for the organization. In the show's 2016 revival, Gilmore Girls: A Year in the Life, Emily Gilmore resigns from the DAR.

In the American medical drama television series Grey's Anatomy, the character Miranda Bailey (portrayed by Chandra Wilson) mentions in the third season episode Scars and Souvenirs that she received a DAR scholarship in her youth. In the fourth season of the American political drama television series The West Wing, in the episode Privateers, First Lady Abbey Bartlet (portrayed by Stockard Channing) is questioned on the validity of her DAR membership by another member, Marion Cotesworth-Haye (portrayed by Helen Slayton-Hughes). In that same episode, Bartlett's daughter, Zoey Bartlet (portrayed by Elisabeth Moss) is inducted into the DAR.

== See also ==
- The Hereditary Society Community of the United States of America
- Daughters of Union Veterans of the Civil War, 1861–1865
- National Society Daughters of the American Colonists
- Colonial Dames of America
- National Society Colonial Dames XVII Century
- General Society Daughters of the Revolution 1776
- Old Stock Americans
- Society of the Cincinnati
- Sons of the American Revolution
- Sons of the Revolution
- Sons of Union Veterans of the Civil War
- The National Society of the Colonial Dames of America
- The United Empire Loyalists Association of Canada
- United States Daughters of 1812
