= Marian Estelle Melson Strack =

American antisemite

- Born: Marian Estelle Melson; April 6, 1898; Wilmington, Delaware, U.S.
- Died: April 22, 1974 (aged 76); Red Bank, New Jersey, U.S.
- Occupation: Socialite
- Spouse(s): Walter H.K. Stommel; Henry D. Strack

Marian Estelle Melson Strack (formerly Stommel; April 6, 1898 – April 22, 1974) was an American socialite and antisemite. She sparked outrage within the Daughters of the American Revolution after giving an antisemitic speech during the organization's annual convention in New Jersey in 1954, leading to DAR members and Jewish community leaders denouncing her statements.

== Early life ==
Strack was born Marian Estelle Melson on April 6, 1898, in Wilmington, Delaware. She was the daughter of Levin F. Melson and lived at 828 Van Buren Street.

== Antisemitist activities ==
In 1954, Strack was a speaker at the New Jersey Society of the Daughters of the American Revolution (DAR)'s annual state conference in Trenton. She made many antisemitic remarks during her speech, including calling kosher markings on canned and packaged goods "clandestine" and claiming that such markiings were evidence of "how a bold minority can impose its will and even its religious observances on an apathetic majority". She went on to say that the markings were "clearly and deliberately planned" to make non-Jewish customers pay "95 percent of the Rabbi's fee". She stated that she would leave the issue of whether or not Kosher labels were an abuse of fair trade practices "up to the lawyers" and called on Christian clergy to decide if they wanted their "vestments, altar cloths, and Communion service washed with a product upon which another religion has already performed a ritual without their knowledge".

In response to her speech, the Community Relations Committee and the Jewish Federation of Trenton wrote an open letter to the Daughters of the American Revolution, calling Strack's comments "false statements and lies against members of the Jewish faith". Rabbi Joshua O. Haberman of Har Sinai Temple denounced Strack's speech as a "swarm of lies and falsehoods". Rabbi S. Joshua Kohn of Adath Israel Synagogue claimed that Strack had done a grave injustice to the DAR and "besmirched the sanctity of the Assembly chamber" of the New Jersey State House.

Seven members of the New Jersey DAR's board of governors denounced Strack's comments and held New Jersey State Regent Mrs. Thomas Reeves responsible for the speech. A fellow DAR member, Mrs. Thomas E. Lynn, condemned Strack's speech saying that it went against the American promise of "liberty and justice to all" and the Christian tenet of brotherly love.

Facing pressure from local groups due to her anti-Jewish statements, the Women's Club of Carteret, New Jersey cancelled a scheduled speech by Strack.

== Personal life ==
She married Walter H.K. Stommel, of Camden, New Jersey, on February 9, 1918, in a ceremony at the parsonage of the German Lutheran Church in Wilmington, Delaware officiated by Rev. Sigmund G. von Bosse. Her husband was an unnaturalized German subject. They had a daughter, Anne M. Stommel, and a son, Henry Melson Stommel. She and her son went on a European tour to visit Denmark, Sweden, and Norway in 1923, returning to Delaware aboard the liner Hellig Olav.

She married a second time to New York attorney Henry D. Strack after the death of his first wife, Mae Woughter Strack. He died May 10, 1947.

Strack was a member of the Daughters of the American Revolution. In 1968 she hosted DAR President General Betty Newkirk Seimes and sixty other prominent women from various hereditary and lineage societies at her home in Locust, New Jersey.
