= Jane Farwell Smith =

30th president general of the Daughters of the American Revolution

30th President General of the Daughters of the American Revolution
- In office 1975–1977
- Preceded by: Sara Roddis Jones
- Succeeded by: Jeannette Osborn Baylies

Personal details
- Born: Jane Elizabeth Farwell; August 16, 1906 Chicago, Illinois, U.S.
- Died: April 21, 1997 (aged 90) Glendale, Wisconsin, U.S.
- Spouse: Wakelee Rawson Smith

Jane Elizabeth Farwell Smith (August 16, 1906 – April 21, 1997) was an American civic leader who served as the 30th president general of the Daughters of the American Revolution from 1975 to 1977.

== Civic life ==
Smith joined the DeWalt Mechlin Chapter of the Daughters of the American Revolution (DAR) in Chicago in June 1950. She served as State Regent of Illinois DAR and as Corresponding Secretary General for the national society before being elected First Vice President General. On February 15, 1975, she temporarily assumed the duties of the president general as Sara Roddis Jones was recovering from a surgery. Jones then took over the term of President General Jones, who died in office, and served as president general for what would have been the remainder of Jones' term.

During her administration, the DAR gave five new state flags to the United States Naval Academy and donated two American flags for the rostrums of the United States House of Representatives and the United States Senate. Also during her term as president general, the DAR purchased a school bus for St. Mary's Episcopal School for Indian Girls in Springfield, South Dakota, built the Smith-Mettetal Activity Building at Tamassee DAR School, and renovations were made to the Old Main Building at Kate Duncan Smith DAR School.

In 1977, she attended the Colorado DAR State Conference at the Brown Palace Hotel in Denver. Following her term as president general, she served as president of the DAR's National Officers Club from 1986 to 1988.

She was also a member of the National Society Magna Charta Dames and Barons.

She served on the awards jury for the Freedoms Foundation and on the board of trustees of the United States Capitol Historical Society.

== Death ==
Smith died in 1997.
