= Westray Battle Long =

Director of the Women's Army Corps

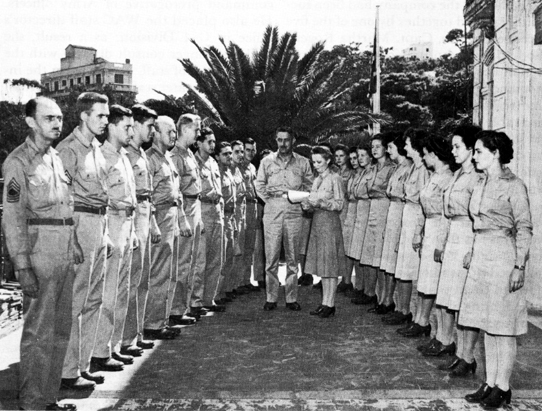
- Boyce reads orders replacing enlisted men of the adjutant general's office with enlisted women, Algiers, North Africa
- Born: Martha Westray Battle; August 10, 1901; Rocky Mount, North Carolina
- Died: January 31, 1972 (aged 70)
- Occupation: Director of the Women's Army Corps (1945-1947)
- Known for: second director of Women's Army Corps
- Successor: Mary A. Hallaren

Colonel Martha Westray Battle Long (August 10, 1901 – January 31, 1972), more commonly known as Westray Battle Long, was the second director of the Women's Army Corps and an early recipient of the Legion of Merit. Before entering the service, Long worked in her first husband's insurance agency and in various government agencies. She is best known for her service during World War II, which included serving on the staff of General Dwight D. Eisenhower. During her military service her name was Westray Battle Boyce.

== Early life ==
Westray Battle Long was born Martha Westray Battle in Rocky Mount, North Carolina. She was born the daughter to Jacob Battle Jr., and Mattie Nash Wright. From 1918 to 1919 Long attended the North Carolina College for Women. From 1921 to 1922 Long attended Pell's Law School. From 1919 to 1934 Long worked in various insurance agencies.

== Marriage and children ==
Long was married three times. Her first marriage was to James Stacy Boyce in 1924. From her first marriage she had a daughter, Westray Battle Boyce (1926-2007), who married James Roy Nicholas. Her second marriage was to William Leslie in 1948. Her third and final marriage was to Willie James Long in 1964.

== Civil Service ==
In March 1934 Long began her work for the United States Government in Washington, DC, working for several different government agencies in various positions. She served as Administrative Director of Litigation for the National Recovery Administration in 1934 and 1935 and as Administrative Assistant to the General Counsel and later as Chief of the Insurance Section in the Rural Electrification Administration from 1936 to 1940. She also worked as Assistant Chief in the Federal Works Agency from 1941 to 1942.

== Military service ==
Long entered military service in 1942, following her work in the Federal Works Agency. She began her service as in Officer Candidate School in the Women's Army Auxiliary Corps (WAAC) at Fort Des Moines Provisional Army Officer Training School in Iowa and graduated on September 12, 1942, as a Third Officer (equivalent to 2nd Lieutenant). In December Long was promoted to First Officer (Captain) within the WAAC. In July 1943 the WAAC became the Women's Army Corps (WAC).

In September 1942 and served as WAAC staff director at 4th Service Command in Atlanta, Georgia. In August 1943, Long was transferred to the North African Theater of Operations as Theater WAC Staff Director. She served as director of all WAC staff under General Dwight D. Eisenhower. While serving in that position, she was promoted to Major in August 1943. She was promoted to lieutenant colonel on February 8, 1944. She became WAC deputy director in May 1945.

For her work on this assignment Long was awarded the European-African-Middle Eastern Theater ribbon (later converted to the European-African-Middle Eastern Campaign Medal) with campaign star, the Bronze Star Medal and the Legion of Merit. She was the first woman in the United States Army to receive the Legion of Merit. (A woman, Lieutenant Junior Grade Ann A. Bernatitus, a Navy Nurse, was the first U.S. Armed Forces recipient of the Legion of Merit in October 1942.)

In August 1944 she transferred to the War Department General Staff. During her time on the staff she worked as a personnel officer. In May 1945 she was appointed the Deputy Director of the Women's Army Corps.

== Director of the Women's Army Corps ==
On July 12, 1945, she succeeded Colonel Oveta Culp Hobby and became the second director of the Women's Army Corps. She was promoted to the rank of colonel.

One of Long's first initiatives while serving as Director of the Women's Army Corps, was making a tour around the world to arrange for the return to the United States of Women's Army Corps members who were eligible for discharge. By doing this, she received the Pacific Theater Ribbon (later converted to the Asiatic-Pacific Campaign Medal).

In 1946, for her accomplishments she made as Director of the Women's Army Corps and her work done with the problem in the Army known as psychoneurosis, Long, Colonel Boyce at the time, was awarded an oak leaf cluster to the Legion of Merit in lieu of a second award. In November 1946 she became the first woman to receive the Cross of Military Service from the United Daughters of the Confederacy. She was a member of the Daughters of the American Revolution.

She remained the Director of the Women's Army Corps until March 1947, when she was hospitalized and resigned from the Army.

== Death and legacy ==
Westray Battle Long died January 31, 1972, at Walter Reed Army Hospital in Washington, D.C. She is buried in the Battle Family Cemetery in Whitakers, North Carolina.

There is a portrait of Long, in uniform, at the Archives and Museum of History Building in Raleigh, North Carolina, and at the National Guard Armory in Rocky Mount, North Carolina. Her wartime papers are preserved at the Harry S. Truman Presidential Library and Museum in Independence, Missouri.

== Awards ==
- Army Staff Identification Badge
- Legion of Merit with oak leaf cluster
- Bronze Star Medal
- Women's Army Corps Service Medal
- American Campaign Medal
- European-African-Middle Eastern Campaign Medal with campaign star
- Asiatic-Pacific Campaign Medal
- World War II Victory Medal
- Cross of Military Service, United Daughters of the Confederacy
