= Jeannette Osborn Baylies =

31st president general of the Daughters of the American Revolution

31st President General of the Daughters of the American Revolution
- In office 1977–1980
- Preceded by: Jane Farwell Smith
- Succeeded by: Patricia Walton Shelby

Personal details
- Born: Jeannette Lawrence Osborn; December 21, 1912 Cambridge, Massachusetts, U.S.
- Died: January 12, 1984 (aged 71) Scarsdale, New York, U.S.
- Spouse: George Upham Baylies

Jeannette Lawrence Osborn Baylies (December 21, 1912 – January 12, 1984) was an American civic leader who served as the 31st president general of the Daughters of the American Revolution from 1977 to 1980. During World War II, she was volunteered as an ambulance driver for the American Red Cross Motor Corps and organized the American Women's Voluntary Services Motor Transport Unit for the United States Air Force.

== Early life and family ==
Baylies was born Jeannette Lawrence Osborn on December 21, 1912, in Cambridge, Massachusetts. Baylies was the daughter of Brigadier General John Frederic Osborn and a direct descendant of John Jay, the first Chief Justice of the Supreme Court of the United States. She was a member of the Children of the American Revolution.

== Career and civic life ==
Baylies worked for ten years in the claims department of a large casualty insurance company in Boston. She was one of a few women who were promoted at the company to investigate industrial accidents in factories and manufacturing plants in Boston. Baylies also served on the editorial staff for the company's magazine.

During World War II, she was a volunteer driver for the American Red Cross Motor Corps Ambulance Service, volunteered at Massachusetts General Hospital, and organized the American Women's Voluntary Services Motor Transport Unit for the United States Air Force. She received an Air Force commendation and a United States Army special citation for her civilian service during the war.

Baylies was a member of the Daughters of the American Revolution, the National Society of New England Women, the Mayflower Society, and the Daughters of Founders and Patriots of America. She was active in the Westchester Heart Association, the White Plains Hospital Association, the Scarsdale Woman's Club, the Scarsdale Historical Society, and the Scarsdale Bicentennial Commission. Baylies was also a member of the Harvard Club of New York City, the Washington Headquarters Association, the Harlem Philharmonic, and the Leadership Foundation. She was named an honorary member of the board of trustees of the Leukemia Society of America and served as a board member for Outstanding Young Women of America.

=== Daughters of the American Revolution ===
She joined the Hannah Winthrop Chapter of the Daughters of the American Revolution (DAR) in Massachusetts in October 1935. She was the third generation of her family to belong to the organization. She transferred to the Harvey Birch Chapter in New York in 1949. She served as State Regent of the New York DAR and as Recording Secretary General for the national society. During her term as New York State Regent, she was appointed to the New York State American Revolution Bicentennial Commission by Governor Nelson Rockefeller.

She was elected president general at the 86th NSDAR Continental Congress in April 1977. During her campaign, a tea party and reception were held for her in Scarsdale.

At the time of her presidency, she was the only DAR President General to have formerly served as a personal page to another president general, when she served as a page to the 16th DAR President General Florence Hague Becker. She was also the first DAR president general to have been a member of the Children of the American Revolution. As president general, she donated two 50-foot flag poles that were placed at the entrance of Memorial Continental Hall in Washington, D.C. She had the Baylies Center built on the ground floor of the DAR Administration Building, which was used to show screenings of the film Home and Country, to hold lectures and seminars, and to house a diorama of the Signers of the Declaration of Independence. During her term, the Jeannette Osborn Baylies Home Economics-Multi-Use Building was constructed at the Kate Duncan Smith DAR School in Grant, Alabama.

As part of an energy savings program, she initiated a 4-day workweek at the DAR Headquarters during the summer months, reducing the monthly electric bill by $5,000 per month.

During her administration, the DAR admitted its first-known Black member, Karen Batchelor, in 1977.

Future president general Merry Ann Thompson Wright served as a personal page to Baylies during her administration.

== Personal life and death ==
She was married to George Upham Baylies, an executive with the American Can Corporation, who died in 1980.

Baylies died at her home in Scarsdale, New York on January 12, 1984, at the age of seventy-one.
