= Sara Roddis Jones =

29th president general of the Daughters of the American Revolution

29th President General of the Daughters of the American Revolution
- In office 1974–1975
- Preceded by: Eleanor Washington Spicer
- Succeeded by: Jane Farwell Smith

Personal details
- Born: Sara Frances Roddis; May 14, 1909 Marshfield, Wisconsin, U.S.
- Died: April 8, 1975 (aged 65) Marshfield, Wisconsin, U.S.
- Spouse: Henry Stewart Jones

Sara Frances Roddis Jones (May 14, 1909 – April 8, 1975) was an American clubwoman who served as the 29th president general of the Daughters of the American Revolution from 1974 to 1975. She died during her term as president general.

== Daughters of the American Revolution ==
Jones joined the Marshield Chapter of the Daughters of the American Revolution (DAR) in 1930. She was appointed as Treasurer General of the national society. In the summer of 1969, Jones, who was then serving as the DAR 1st Vice President General, went on a European tour with President General Betty Newkirk Seimes, visiting London and Paris, as well as the birthplace of the Marquis de Lafayette.

She ran for president general in 1974.

As president general, she was a member of the editorial committee of the Hereditary Register of the United States of America. For her president general's project, she planned murals for the East Corridor of the House Wing of the United States Capitol. Under her administration, the DAR Good Citizen Award, previously only awarded to girls, was opened up to boys. She participated in special briefings at the White House and presented an American flag to the National Museum of African Art in Washington, D.C.

She kept a pair of early 20th-century solid cast bronze bookends in her official office at the DAR Headquarters in Washington, D.C. Following her death, the bookends were gifted to Jones' family by the DAR Museum, a controversial decision that led to the resignation of three museum employees.

Jones died on April 8, 1975, while serving her term as president general, just six days before she was expected to preside over the 84th NSDAR Continental Congress. Jones died shortly after undergoing surgery. Following her death, President Gerald Ford released a statement honoring her. Jones was succeeded by First Vice President General Jane Farwell Smith of Illinois, who served the remainder of Jones' term.
