= May Erwin Talmadge =

American civic leader (1885–1973)

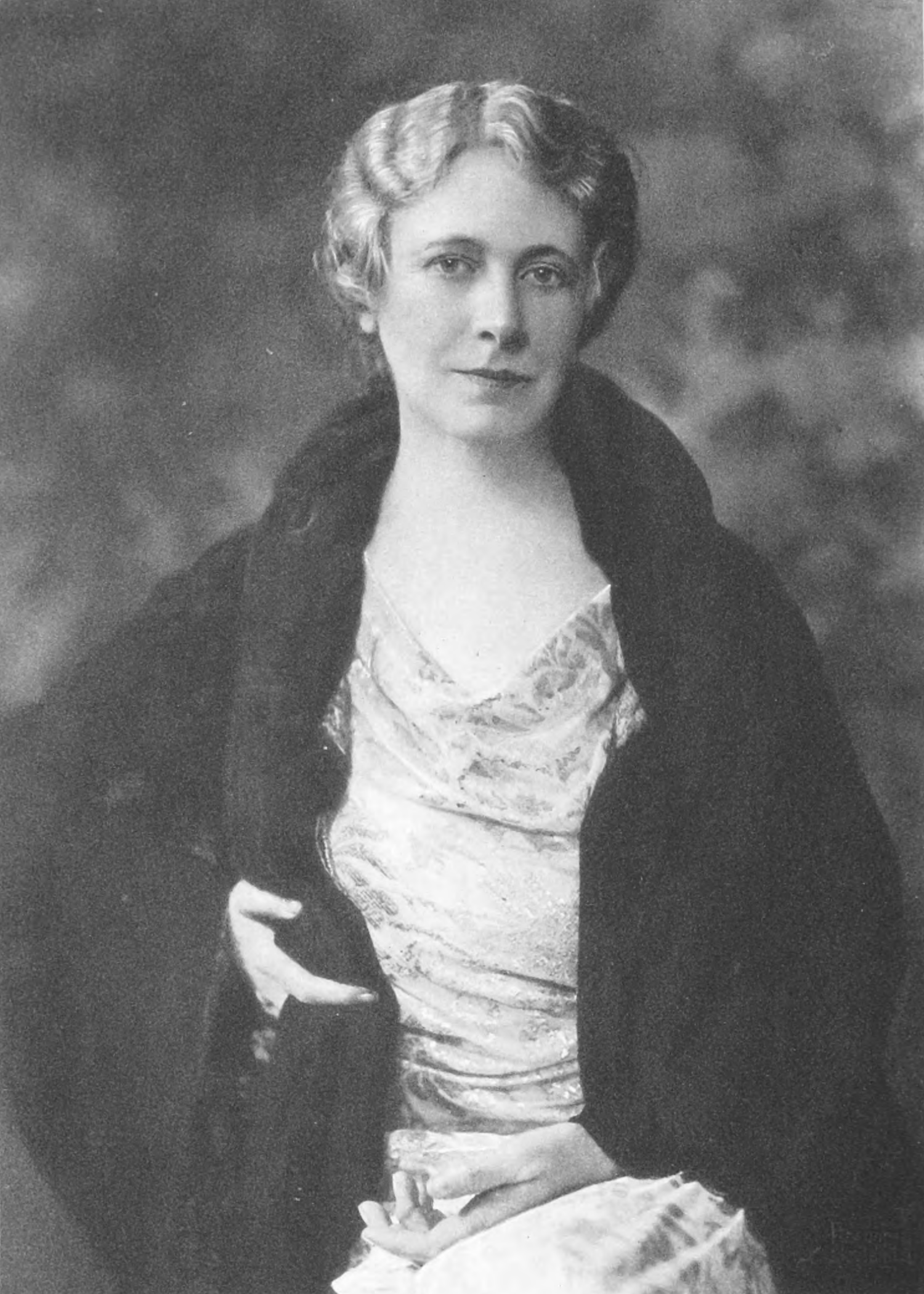
- Talmadge in 1938

19th President General of the National Society Daughters of the American Revolution
- In office 1944–1947
- Preceded by: Helena R. Hellwig Pouch
- Succeeded by: Estella Armstrong O'Byrne

Personal details
- Born: May Marie Erwin; February 26, 1885 Chattanooga, Tennessee, U.S.
- Died: August 2, 1973 (aged 88) Athens, Georgia, U.S.
- Resting place: Oconee Hill Cemetery
- Party: Democratic
- Spouse: Julius Young Talmadge
- Children: 1

May Marie Erwin Talmadge (February 26, 1885 – August 2, 1973) was an American civic leader who served as the 19th president general of the Daughters of the American Revolution. She was the first president general of the national society from the U.S. state of Georgia. Her administration led the Daughters of the American Revolution through World War II, donating money and resources to the American Red Cross. She attended the 1945 United Nations Conference of International Organization and was appointed by U.S. president Harry S. Truman to serve on the National Famine Emergency Council.

== Early life ==
Talmadge was born May Marie Erwin on February 26, 1885 in Chattanooga, Tennessee to Harry Johnson Erwin and Mary A. Mills Erwin. Her mother was a founding member of the Judge David Campbell Chapter of the Daughters of the American Revolution in Chattanooga. She was a great-great granddaughter of Congressman Thomas Jefferson Campbell.

== Public life and society ==
Talmadge was a member of the American Legion Auxiliary, the Colonial Dames of America, the Daughters of Barons of Runnymede, the United Daughters of the Confederacy, and The Society of the Friends of St George's and Descendants of the Knights of the Garter.

A Democrat, Talmadge served as a delegate to the Democratic National Convention in 1948 and in 1952.

In the 1950s, she worked with the Georgia State Board of Education, during a time when Georgia schools were being integrated. Some of her letters from this period, pertaining to racial policies, integration, and book banning, are housed in the University of Georgia Special Collections Library.

=== Daughters of the American Revolution ===
Talmadge was active in the Daughters of the American Revolution for over sixy-two years. She served as chapter regent of the Elijah Clarke Chapter of the Daughters of the American Revolution from 1916 to 1919. Talmadge served as the society's State Regent of Georgia from 1924 to 1926. She was elected as the nineteenth president general of the society, serving from 1944 to 1947. She was the first president general to be elected from Georgia.

In 1945, during World War II, Talmadge complied with the Office of Defense Transportation's wartime restrictions on civilian organizations by cancelling the 54th NSDAR Continental Congress, which was scheduled to convene in Chicago in April of that year. In March 1945, Talmadge said of the cancellation of congress, "It will be a disappointment—but not a hardship—for no sacrifice is too great for the DAR Society to make, if it means added comfort and convenience to our service men traveling to and from their line of duty." She held an extended National Board of Management meeting for the DAR in April 1945 to ensure that national officers, national chairs, and state regents would be able to deliver their annual reports. Talmadge oversaw the authorization of over $50,000 in financial contributions to various state-level chapters of the American Red Cross for vehicle purchases and their blood plasma program. Through the DAR War Fund, her administration directed the purchase of X-ray units for hospital ships and field ambulances and the donation of over 600 two-way radio sets for bedridden patients. They also donated more than thirty motion picture machines to hospitals.

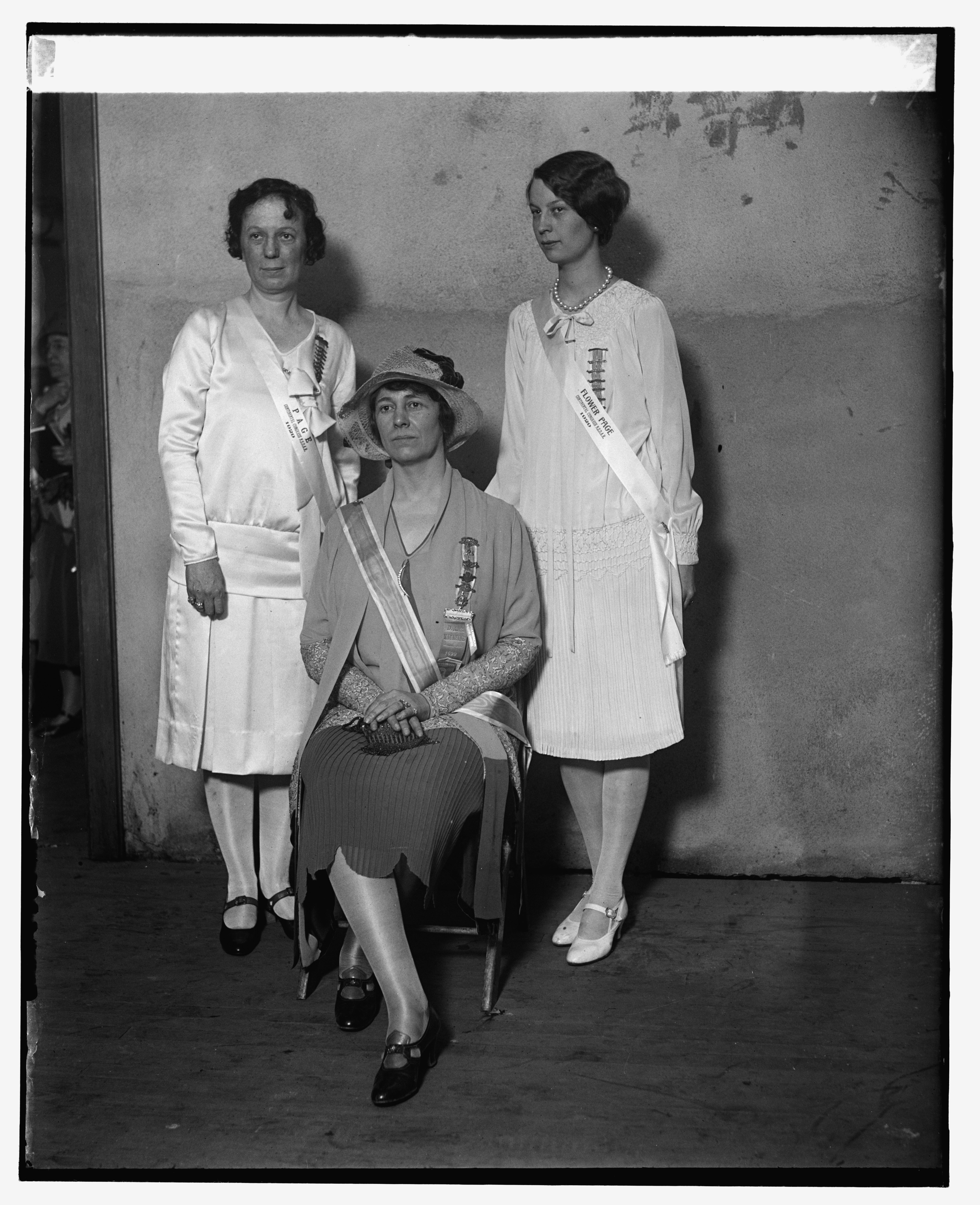
Talmadge (center) with two pages at NSDAR Continental Congress in 1929

Talmadge attended the United Nations Conference of International Organization in San Francisco in 1945 as an observer.

Following the end of the war in September 1945, Talmadge held the 55th NSDAR Continental Congress away from Memorial Continental Hall, instead hosting it at the Marlborough-Blenheim Hotel in Atlantic City, New Jersey in May 1956. During her opening address, she said, "The task of rebuilding awaits. We are strong. Let us go forward in our aim together—and God bless you in every step." As the war had ended, Talmadge redirected the remaining money in the war fund to go to Tamassee DAR School and Kate Duncan Smith DAR School.

President Harry S. Truman appointed Talmadge to the National Famine Emergency Council. She was also invited by the United States Department of War to attend a two-day visitation and inspection of the Universal Military Training Experimental Unit at Fort Knox.

Talmadge's project, as president general, was the construction of the bell tower at Valley Forge, which the DAR raised $125,000 for the construction of. She also established the DAR Press Relations Office and its corresponding annual publication, Press Digest, focusing on portraying the national society in a more positive light following the controversy regarding the DAR's refusal to allow Marian Anderson to perform at DAR Constitution Hall.

She was elected as honorary president general in 1947, following the end of her term as president general.

== Personal life ==
Talmadge was a member of the Presbyterian Church.

She was married to Julius Young Talmadge, a businessman. They had one son, Captain Harry Erwin Talmadge, a doctor and military officer. The family lived in a Colonial Revival mansion in Athens, Georgia.

Talmadge died in Athens in 1973. She was buried in Oconee Hill Cemetery. Her grave was marked with a memorial by the Georgia State Society of the Daughters of the American Revolution in 1975.

== Legacy ==
A historical marker for Talmadge was placed by her home in Athens in 2001.

The Mary Erwin Talmadge Auditorium at the Tamassee DAR School in Tamassee, South Carolina, is named in her honor.
