= Marie Laurence de Rochefort =

French socialite and writer

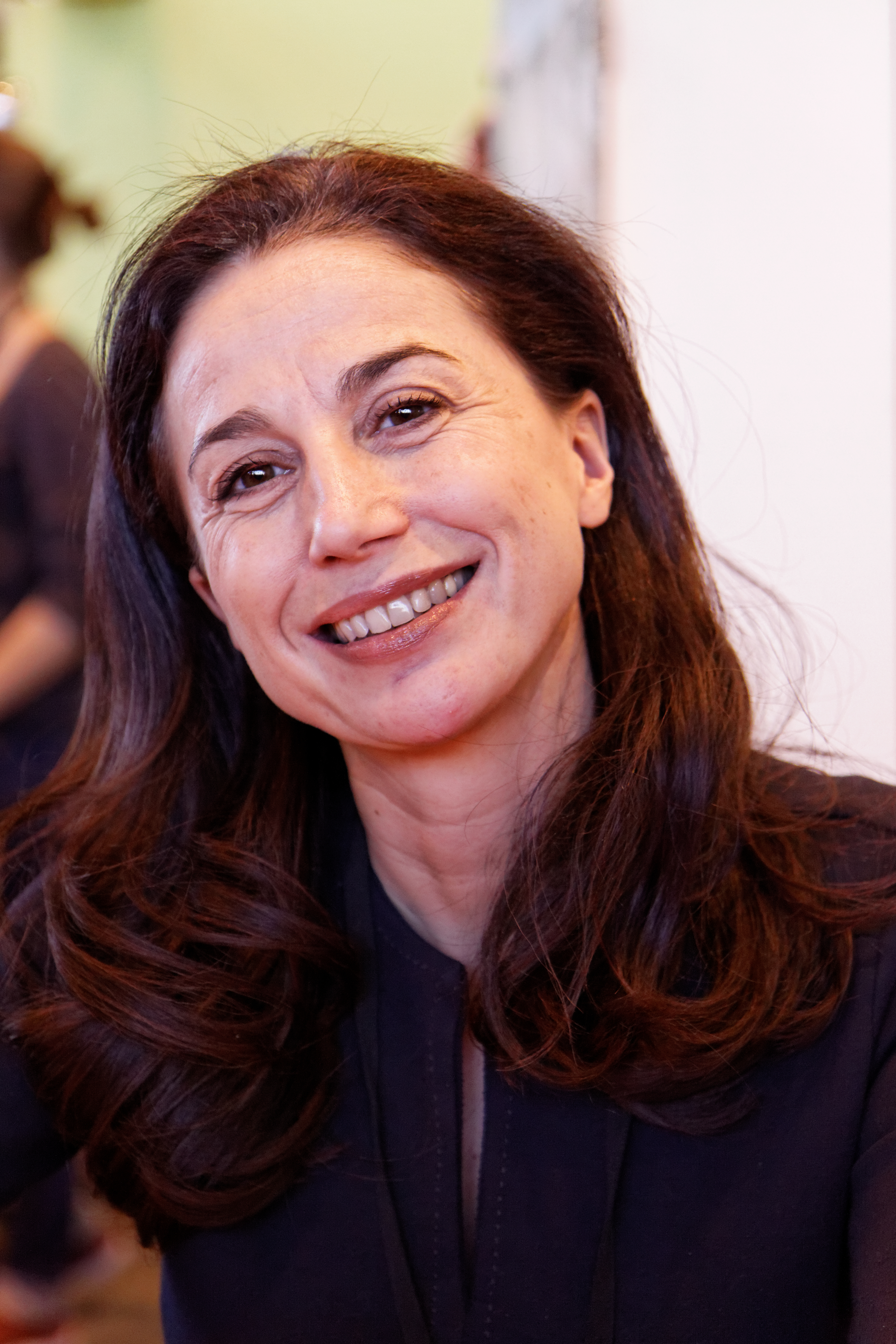
- de Rochefort in 2012

France State Society Regent, Daughters of the American Revolution
- In office 2022–2025

Personal details
- Parent(s): Jean Frédéric Farges de Rochefort-Sirieyx (father); Godeleine Houzel (mother)
- Occupation: television host writer socialite

Marie Laurence Farges de Rochefort-Sirieyx is a French socialite, writer, television personality, and philanthropist. From 2022 to 2025, she served as the French State Society Regent for the Daughters of the American Revolution.

== Career ==
De Rochefort worked as a public relations consultant with Haut & Court, Marc Dorcel, the Catholic Church in France, and Jean-Luc Godard and was a television presenter, hosting the French show Ladies Night for Paris Première TV and On en Parle à Paris for French National TV 3. De Rochefort also wrote fashion and gossip columns for various French magazines. She authored two novels, Everything You Wanted to Know About Women Without Asking and Yes you Cannes.

In 2012, de Rochefort served as a jury member for the Angel Film Awards during the Monaco International Film Festival.

=== Society and philanthropy ===
De Rochefort is a prominent socialite and has been photographed in society publications. She worked for over fifteen years with the French charities La Soupe Saint Eustache and Notre Damne de Salut in Lourdes.

De Rochefort has held multiple offices in the French State Society of the National Society Daughters of the American Revolution (NSDAR), including as the regent of the Rochambeau Chapter in Paris. In 2022, she became the French Society NSDAR's State Regent, and served in that office until 2025. In 2023, she hosted DAR President General Pamela Rouse Wright and other national officers in Paris.
