= Maria Williams-Cole =

First African-American member of the NSDAR in Prince George's County, Maryland

Maria Williams-Cole is an American woman who became the first African-American in Prince George's County, Maryland to be inducted into the Daughters of the American Revolution.

In July 1969, when she was thirteen years old, Williams-Cole and her grandmother recorded the names of her father's ancestors on a family tree chart purchased from Montgomery Ward while at her grandmother's home in Findlay, Ohio. Williams-Cole discovered that, through her mother, she is a direct descendent of Absalom Martin, a free black soldier from Beaufort County, North Carolina who served during the American Revolutionary War. She is also a descendant of Revolutionary War patriot Isaac Carter.

In 2004, she and her mother, Arleathia Carter Williams, joined the Hyattsville Chapter of the Daughters of the American Revolution, becoming the first two black members of the society in Prince George's County. She is credited with raising more money for the Daughters of the American Revolution than any other African-American member.

In 2012, Williams-Cole attended the DAR's Continental Congress in Washington, D.C.

In September 2016, Williams-Cole donated an oil painting depicting African-American descendants of American patriots as their Revolutionary War ancestors to the Isaac Carter Chapter of the Sons of the American Revolution. She was instrumental in helping establish the Patriot Isaac Carter Chapter and was named the chapter's honorary "DAR Mother".
