= Eleanor Washington Spicer =

28th President general of the Daughters of the American Revolution

28th President General of the Daughters of the American Revolution
- In office 1971–1974
- Preceded by: Betty Newkirk Seimes
- Succeeded by: Sara Roddis Jones

Personal details
- Born: August 24, 1903 Key West, Florida, U.S.
- Died: September 13, 1974 (aged 71) Fairfax, Virginia, U.S.
- Resting place: Fort Rosecrans National Cemetery
- Party: Republican
- Spouse: Donald Spicer
- Children: 4

Eleanor Washington Sullivan Spicer (August 24, 1903 – September 13, 1974) was an American clubwoman and philanthropist who served as the 28th president general of the Daughters of the American Revolution from 1971 to 1974. During World War II, she served as president of the American Women's Voluntary Services branch in Coronado, California and worked as a department head for the Naval Civil Service.

== Early life and family ==
Spicer was the daughter of an officer of the United States Marine Corps. She descended from the Washington family and the Lewis family, both part of the Virginia landed gentry. She also descended from New England Pilgrim leaders, New Jersey Quakers, and Kentucky pioneers. She was a direct descendant of George Washington's only sister, Elizabeth Washington Lewis.

== Civic service ==
During World War II, Spicer served as president of the American Women's Voluntary Services in Coronado, California. She also supported the United Service Organizations, served as home chairman for the American Red Cross, was a trained Red Cross welfare aide, and worked as head of a department in the Naval Civil Service.

She served as president of the Coronado Woman's Club and was a member of the Republican Women's Club and the San Diego Symphony Association.

=== Daughters of the American Revolution ===
Spicer joined the Augusta Chapter of the Daughters of the American Revolution (DAR) in 1938. She transferred to the California DAR in 1953 and served two terms as regent of the Oliver Wetherbee Chapter in Coronado.

She served as state regent of the California DAR and then as historian general of the national society from 1968 until her election as president general in 1971. She defeated Mrs. Wilson King Barnes of Baltimore in the election, and the campaigning around the country for one year in what was referred to by The New York Times as a "bloody battle". She was the first woman from the West Coast to be elected president general. As president general, her national project was refurbishing the Governor's Council Chamber and the Assembly Committee Room inside Independence Hall in Philadelphia. She and the national society were personally thanked by President Richard Nixon during the 83rd DAR Continental Congress in Washington, D.C. She presented Hobart G. Cawood, the superintendent of Independence National Historical Park, with a book of remembrance listing the DAR's contributions made towards furnishing and restoring Independence Hall.

Spicer participated in the United States Department of Defense's week-long Joint Civilian Orientation Conference, touring military installations in Colorado, Florida, Georgia, Nebraska, and South Carolina. During her administration, the DAR became a member of the United States Department of Veterans Affairs' National Advisory Committee.

=== Awards and recognition ===
Spicer was given the Dickey Chapelle Award by the Marine Corps League and was made an honorary life member of the United States Marine Band. In 1974, she was made an honorary park ranger by Ronald H. Walker, the director of the National Park Service.

== Personal life and death ==
She was married to Colonel Donald Spicer, an officer in the United States Marine Corps. Shortly after their wedding, she went with her husband to Haiti. During World War II, Spicer's husband was held as a prisoner of war by the Japanese for 45 months. She and her husband had four children and lived at 811 Country Club Lane in Coronado. One of her sons was a captain in the United States Navy Medical Corps and another was a lieutenant in the Marine Corps. Her son-in-law was a major in the Marine Corps who was killed during the Korean War.

Spicer was an Episcopalian and was active in church work.

She died on September 13, 1974.
