= Ella Park Lawrence =

Leader, philanthropist, and "mother" of the Illinois State Flag

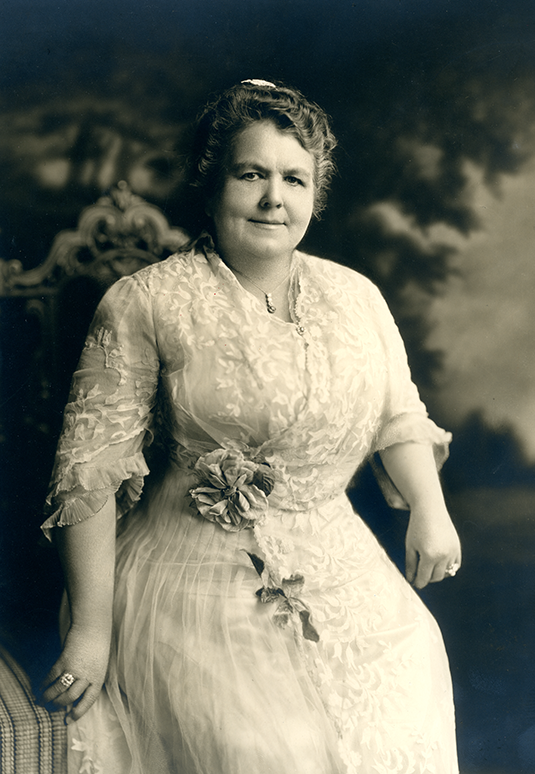
- Born: May 13, 1857
- Died: March 17, 1924 (age 66)
- Resting place: Hope Cemetery, Galesburg, IL
- Occupation: State Regent of the Illinois Chapters of the DAR
- Parent(s): George S. Park and Mary Louise Holmes Park

Ella Park Lawrence (May 13, 1857 – March 17, 1924) was an American civic leader and an avid advocate for, and is still known today as the “mother” of the Illinois State Flag. She was the Regent of the Rebecca Park chapter of the Daughters of the American Revolution (DAR), State Regent of the DAR organizations in Illinois, as well as a known leader and philanthropist of her community, Galesburg, Illinois.

== Early life and family ==
Ella Louise Park was born May 13, 1857, to father George S. Park and Mary Louise Holmes Park. Many of her family members have been notable throughout history. Ancestors of Lawrence came to America in 1639 and eight of her ancestors had fought in the Revolutionary War. During the Civil War, her father ran an abolitionist newspaper, and was also the founder of Park College, and the town Parkville in Platte County, Missouri, where Lawrence was born. Lawrence was born during the tensions proceeding the Civil War and grew up during, and throughout reconstruction and the aftermath. It is said that her family’s involvement and pride in their county led to Lawrence’s love and respect for the U.S. flag, which impacted her later actions in life.

Lawrence attended Knox College in 1874 as a part of the class of 1878, but did not graduate. She furthered her education by attending Vassar College until ill health compelled her to return home in 1877. Lawrence was said to have been a good student, winning numerous literary awards and was a prominent member of the college’s literary society. During her time at Knox College, she met her husband, George A Lawrence, who also was a prominent figure in the Galesburg Community, as well as an attorney, and they got married October 18, 1882.

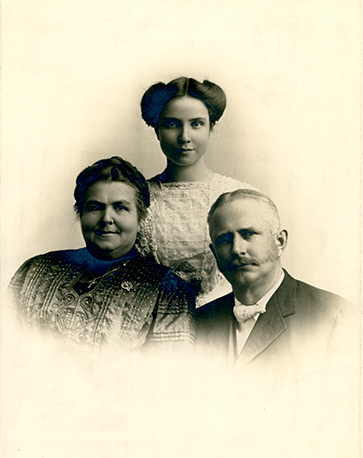
Ella Park Lawrence and Family

Together, the Lawrences had five children, unfortunately four of them died young. Their third child, Ella Rebecca Lawrence, who married John Marshall Lowrie in 1916 and became Ella Rebecca Lowrie, lived to be 84, and throughout her life was known as a scholar, attending Vassar College in 1913 and later receiving her M.A. in history from Radcliffe College. Throughout her life she had many positions, being a teacher at Knox College, a book reviewer for Harper Brothers (now Harper and Row), and an author of a few books herself.

== Illinois state flag involvement ==
Though Lawrence herself did not design the Illinois state flag, she did have a large part in the establishment of the flag and advocating for its creation. This advocacy began with her participation in the Daughters of the American Revolution, and later her time as State Regent, and honorary Regent, of the DAR organizations in Illinois.

=== Daughters of the American Revolution ===
Lawrence helped organize the Rebecca Gibson Parke chapter of the Daughters of the American Revolution, which was named after Lawrence’s ancestor, Rebecca Gibson Parke, who was a child living in Lexington, Massachusetts, when the Revolutionary War began. This chapter was officially established in 1901, and by 1911 Lawrence was elected State Regent of the DAR organizations in Illinois.

As State Regent, she traveled to Washington DC for the DAR’s annual National Congress. It was here that Lawrence’s fight for an Illinois state flag began, as she was walking through the DAR’s Memorial Continental Hall. Lawrence noticed many other state flags in the impressive building that the DAR had contributed much time and effort to, and desired to see a flag for Illinois beside the banners of the other states.

During her time as State Regent, and after she left this office, Lawrence worked avidly for several years, writing hundreds of letters to state legislators, other DAR members, and public officials to gather support for the adoption of an Illinois state flag.

=== Design contest for the Illinois state flag ===
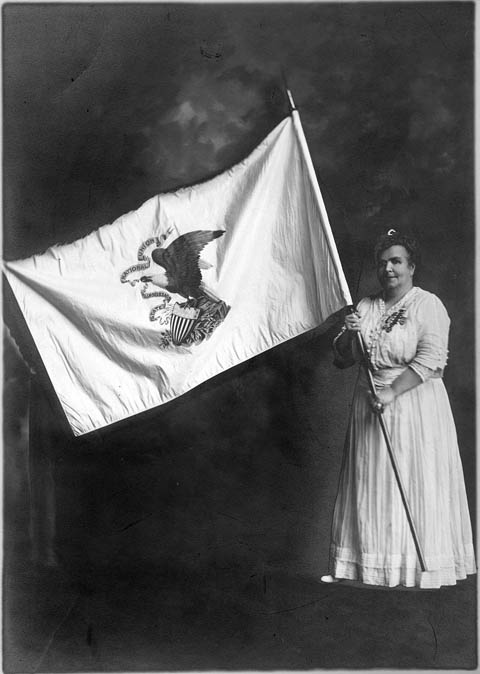
Ella Park Lawrence Holding Illinois State Flag

Lawrence organized a design contest to spur support and come up with a design that could be used for an Illinois state flag. She wrote to every DAR chapter in the state of Illinois and offered a $25 prize for the winning design, which is equivalent to almost $500 today. Lawrence received designs from all over Illinois, totaling around three dozen designs. A panel of four judges was put together to decide a winner. The judges were Secretary of State Lewis Stevenson, Supreme Court Justice Charles Craig, Superintendent of Public Instruction Francis Blair, and Hugh Magill of the Illinois State Art Commission. The winner of the contest was Lucy Derwent, a member of the DAR’s chapter in Rockford, IL. The design selected was an emblem shown on the state seal displayed on a white flag, the same design which is used today.

=== Senate Bill No. 446. ===
In 1915, after years of hard work, Senate Bill No. 446. was passed which established Lucy Derwent’s design as the Illinois state flag. The bill stated the usefulness of a state flag for the military, civic engagements, and organizations when meeting. They agreed that “the emblem upon said great seal would be a most appropriate insignia for the uses indicated herein,” and allowed the “great seal” to be reproduced for the use of a state banner, but only in black and white, or national colors, on a white sheet or background. This was filed on July 6, 1915, the full report of this bill was given in October, and Lawrence was given the first official Illinois State Flag made by the Meyers Military Flag-Shop Company in Washington, D.C. Other flags were given out later, one being to the Daughters of the American Revolution in Illinois.

== Later life ==
Though her fight for the state flag ended with its establishment in 1915, Lawrence continued to be a vital part of her community as a philanthropist and leader. In 1916, Lawrence was named Honorary State Regent of Illinois for life for all of her hard work and dedication, especially in regards to her work on getting the Illinois State Flag established. She was also known for “installing patriotism” through schools, helping with disaster relief, advocating for better roads, and organizing children’s clubs and homemaker’s societies. Lawrence established a club called “The Booker Washington Club for Colored Boys” which sought to teach “good citizenship and patriotism” to boys ages eight to ten. She and her husband donated often to their community church, as well as to both Knox College and Park College, one notable and celebrated donation being a provisional gift of $75,000 given to Park College in 1916.

=== Philanthropy and community involvement ===
Lawrence held many roles throughout her life, being a member of the Presbyterian Church of Galesburg, for years the President of the society of her church, a charter member of the Board of Trustees of Park College, and an officer in numerous philanthropic and charitable institutions, especially those that were interested in the welfare of women and children.

=== Honorary degree ===
In June 1922, Lawrence received an honorary degree from Knox College. She received a Master of Arts and at the ceremony Dr. McConaughy, who was leading the ceremony, commented on her efforts within the community, her time as a student, her and her husband's time as trustees, and overall the betterment of the citizens in Galesburg, IL, because of her.

=== Death ===
Lawrence died in her home on March 17, 1924, at age 66, and was buried in Hope Cemetery in Galesburg, IL, with her family. Her husband George Lawrence died a decade late.
