= Adele Woodhouse Erb Sullivan =

President General of the Daughters of the American Revolution

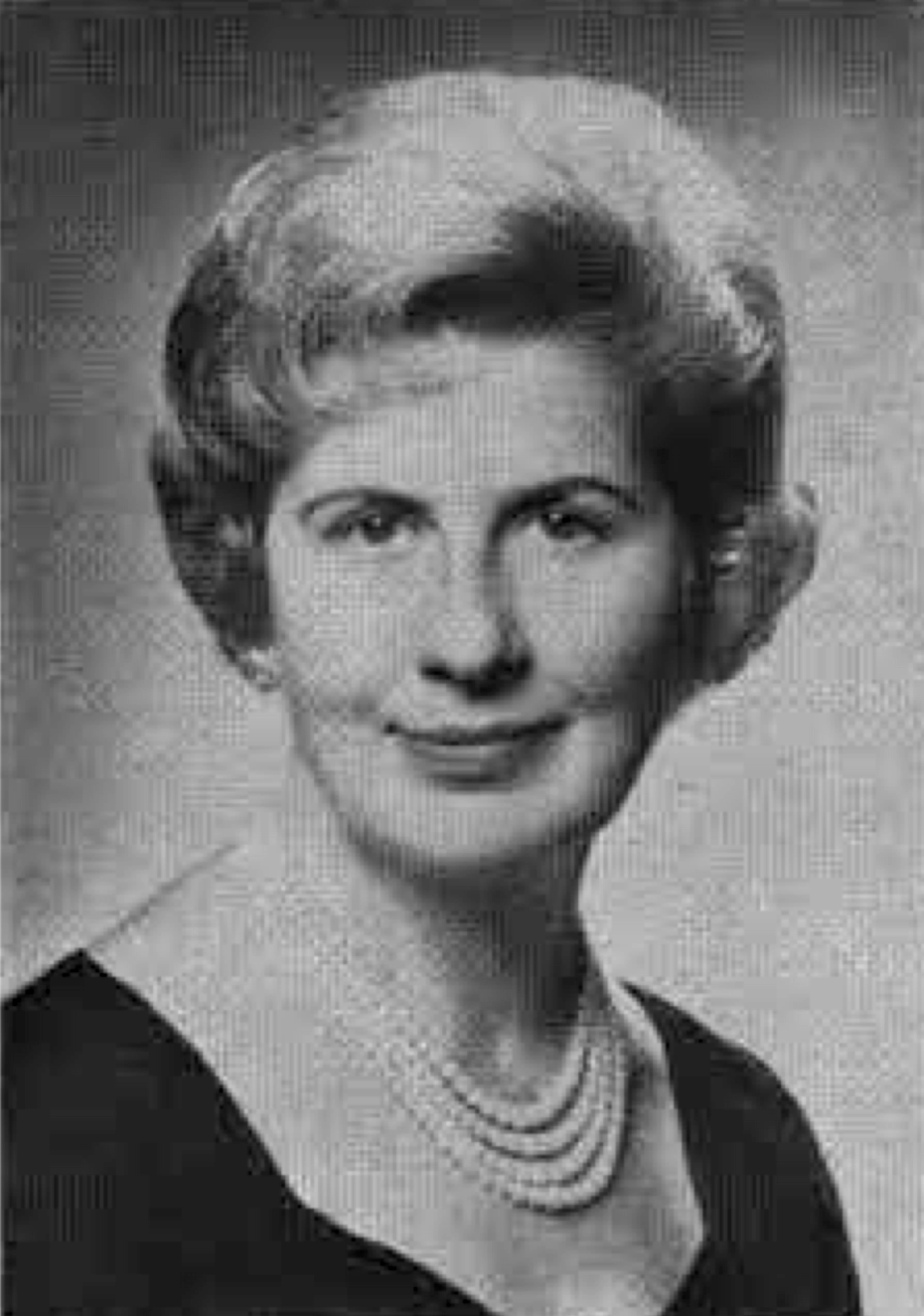
- Sullivan in 1967

26th DAR President General, National Society Daughters of the American Revolution
- In office 1965–1968
- Preceded by: Marion Moncure Duncan
- Succeeded by: Betty Newkirk Seimes

Personal details
- Born: Adele Woodhouse; May 20, 1907 Trenton, New Jersey, U.S.
- Died: April 22, 1999 (aged 91) Wilton, Connecticut, U.S.
- Spouse(s): Harold E. Erb; William H. Sullivan Jr.
- Children: 1

Adele Woodhouse Erb Sullivan (May 20, 1907 – April 22, 1999) served as the 26th President General of the Daughters of the American Revolution and noted for her 1968 visit to Vietnam with General William C. Westmoreland.

== Personal life ==
Adele Woodhouse was born on 20 May 1907 in Trenton, New Jersey, to William Woodhouse and Adaline Dearth. She attended Rider College. Adele first married Harold E. Erb, who died in 1957, and later married William H. Sullivan Jr., who died in 1985. She had one daughter, Nancy Erb, and two granddaughters. She died on 22 April 1999 in Wilton, Connecticut, and is buried at Ferncliff Cemetery and Mausoleum.

== DAR Membership ==
Sullivan joined the DAR in 1930 as a Junior Member with the Matinecock Chapter of Flushing, Queens and later transferred to the Harvey Birch Chapter. Her Patriot Ancestor was Israel Matson of Philadelphia. She served as Regent of the Matinecock Chapter (1941–1944), was State, and later National, Chairman of the Radio Committee, New York Vice Regent (1950–1953), New York State Regent (1953–1956), and Recording Secretary General (1956-1959). She ran against Alice B. Haig for the position of President General.

=== President General Administration ===
Sullivan's administration was known as the Diamond Jubilee Administration, commemorating the 75th anniversary of the founding of the DAR. One of Sullivan's goals was to increase DAR membership from 185,000 to 200,000 by the end of the anniversary. "Winkie" the owl was the symbol of the administration. The highlight of her administration was her visit to Vietnam in 1968.

The executive board for the Sullivan administration was:

- First Vice President General: Mrs. Nelson Kilbourn
- Chaplain General: Mrs. Fred Osborne
- Recording Secretary General: Mrs. Charlotte W. Sayre
- Corresponding Secretary General: Mrs. Jackson E. Stewart
- Organizing Secretary General: Miss Amanda A. Thomas
- Treasurer General: Mrs. Henry Stewart Jones
- Registrar General: Mrs. Evelyn Cole Peters (Albert G.)
- Historian General: Mrs. Forrest Fay Lange
- Librarian General: Mrs. Herbert Dwight Forrest
- Curator General: Mrs. Frederick Tracey Morse
- Reporter General: Mrs. John James Champieux

Although the DAR declares itself to be a non-political organization, they have long spoken out publicly regarding political issues under the guise of Patriotism. This trend continued during the Sullivan administration. Sullivan herself personally advocated on topics such as Vietnam and peace protests, immigration quotas, and disarmament. When asked about black membership in the DAR, Sullivan answered indirectly; she replied that she did not know if the DAR had any black members (the DAR does not record the race of members on applications), but stated that "with all the intermarriage in the United States, we undoubtedly have members or women eligible for membership who ancestry includes someone of the Negro race."

McCall's magazine published a feature titled “If I Were President” in their January 1968 edition. Sullivan was one of sixteen women who "made a distinct and varied contribution to our national life" what they would do as the first female President of the United States. Other women interviewed included Margaret Chase Smith, Betty Friedan, Leontyne Price, and Martha Griffiths. Sullivan spoke in favor of officially declaring war in Vietnam War, a strong national defense, and a stronger role of "the church" in the United States. Sullivan was very much aware of the power of the media and the impact that it could have on the DAR. She was often interviewed and appeared on television shows, such as The David Susskind Show and reported that she preferred live events over recorded ones which were "too easy to edit."

Highlights of the Sullivan administration:

- Celebration of the DAR's Diamond Jubilee, October 10–14, 1965.
- Installation of air conditioning and the refurbishment of Constitution Hall
- DAR Schools Committee funding and construction of the Adele Erb Sullivan Administration Building at Tamassee DAR School, dedicated in 1967.
- Sullivan represented the DAR during a visit to Vietnam in 1968.
- Establishment of the Special Committee for DAR Services for Veteran-Patients.
- Creation of the Dr. Anita Newcomb McGee Award, given to the outstanding Army Nurse of the Year.

=== Vietnam ===
The Sullivan administration coincided with the US ground war in Vietnam, which greatly impacted the administration's activities. In keeping with its mission of Patriotism, the DAR strongly supported American soldiers fighting in Vietnam while it denigrated those in the "so-called peace movement," citing their "long hair, beards, and untidy dress." Sullivan warned against "an ideological war planned to capture the minds of men through propaganda," the danger of apathy toward Communism, and the importance of educating children on the "correct facts" of America. The DAR Magazine featured a multipage section for the National Defense Committee each month, which often focused on the war in Vietnam or Communism. Guest writers included John S. McCain Jr., who wrote about fighting Communism in February 1966, Charles E. Whittaker, who spoke against mass disobedience in January 1966, and Daniel J. Flood, who warned of Communism in the Panama Canal in January 1967. In the fall of 1967, Sullivan declined to allow folk-singer Joan Baez perform at DAR Constitution Hall, as the singer's pacifist viewpoints, lack of paying taxes, and "reported activities" were not "in line with [their] objectives," and that the DAR was "very much behind our boys in Vietnam."

Sullivan herself visited Bethesda Naval and Walter Reed Hospitals and encouraged all DAR members, as part of "Operation Appreciation," to do the same in their communities. Members could support troops by providing gift cards, cigarettes or baked goods, as well as writing to family members of soldiers. However, in her monthly letter to members in the May 1968 edition of the DAR Magazine, Sullivan reflected that the DAR "as a Society, [has] made no tangible contribution to assist our fighting forces" in Vietnam. She reported that after consulting with a number of DAR and US government officials, it was decided that "a personal visit by the President General of the NSDAR to the combat area would be the greatest contribution our Society could make to the war effort at this time."

Reportedly, based in part on the DAR's action against Beaz, the organization gained the attention of General William C. Westmoreland, who thought that a visit from Sullivan to Vietnam would be a "worthwhile contribution" to the US effort there. Sullivan and other DAR representatives arrived Vietnam on 21 January 1968. While there she visited hospitals and presented 47 Americanism pins to wounded soldiers in recognition of their bravery. Upon returning to the US, she stated that, "American boys there believe in the war. They believe in their leaders. They don't know what's the matter with some of the people back home, like those who are burning their draft cards."
