= Patricia Walton Shelby =

American civic leader

32nd President General of the Daughters of the American Revolution
- In office 1980–1983
- Preceded by: Jeannette Osborn Baylies
- Succeeded by: Sarah McKelley King

Personal details
- Born: November 11, 1928 Memphis, Tennessee, U.S.
- Died: June 14, 2002 (aged 73) Greenville, Mississippi, U.S.
- Spouse: Richard Denny Shelby
- Children: 1
- Education: Mississippi State University (B.S.)
- Occupation: businesswoman

Patricia Walton Shelby (November 11, 1928 – June 14, 2002) was an American businesswoman and civic leader who served as the 32nd President General of the Daughters of the American Revolution from 1980 to 1983. She also served as president of the National Gavel Society and was a member of the board of trustees for the United States Capitol Historical Society.

== Early life and education ==
Shelby was born on November 11, 1928 in Memphis, Tennessee. She was raised Methodist and attended Rosedale United Methodist Church. Shelby graduated from Rosedale High School. She attended Ward–Belmont College and later earned a Bachelor of Science degree from Mississippi State University, where she was a member of Chi Omega.

== Career and civic life ==
Shelby was the owner and manager of Walton Farms.

She served a three-year term as president of the National Gaval Society and was a member of the Board of Trustees of the United States Capitol Historical Society for fifteen years. She also served on the United States Bicentennial Committee.

=== Daughters of the American Revolution ===
Shelby joined the Mississippi Delta Chapter of the Daughters of the American Revolution (DAR) in October 1949. She served as State Regent of the Mississippi DAR and as Registrar General for the national society. She then served as first vice president.

She was elected as President General of the DAR and served in that capacity from 1980 to 1983. During her administration, the DAR established the Outstanding Teacher of American History Award and presented the DAR Medal of Honor to Sidney Dillon Ripley, the Secretary of the Smithsonian Institution; L. Bruce Laingen, the United States Chargé d'Affaires to Iran; Fran McKee, the first female line officer to hold the rank of Rear Admiral in the United States Navy; Margaret Chase Smith, Chair of the Senate Republican Conference; and the actress Lillian Gish.

During her administration, the DAR Museum exhibited "The Jewish Community in Early America, 1654-1850", showing a collection on loan from John Loeb of New York City. Former president Gerald Ford attended the exhibit's opening. She also hosted William F. Bolger, the United States Postmaster General, during the first day issue ceremonies for the Dolley Madison and the Philip Mazzei postal stamps in the DAR Library.

In February 1981, Shelby planted two cedar trees and placed a wreath at the George Washington Birthplace National Monument in celebration of the 250th anniversary of President George Washington's birth. In October 1981, she honored French Ambassador François Lefebvre de Laboulaye at a gala in DAR Constitution Hall for the Bicentennial of the Victory at Yorktown and met with French President François Mitterrand and Danielle Mitterrand aboard De Grasse.

Shelby was president of the DAR's National Officers Club from 1990 to 1992.

== Personal life and death ==
She married Richard Denny Shelby in 1950. They had one son, Richard Shelby Jr. She served as the organist at Rosedale United Methodist Church for fifty years.

Shelby died of lung disease on June 14, 2002 at King's Daughters Hospital in Greenville, Mississippi. Her funeral and burial took place at Beulah Cemetery.
