= Locust, New Jersey =

Populated place in Monmouth County, New Jersey, US

- Unincorporated community
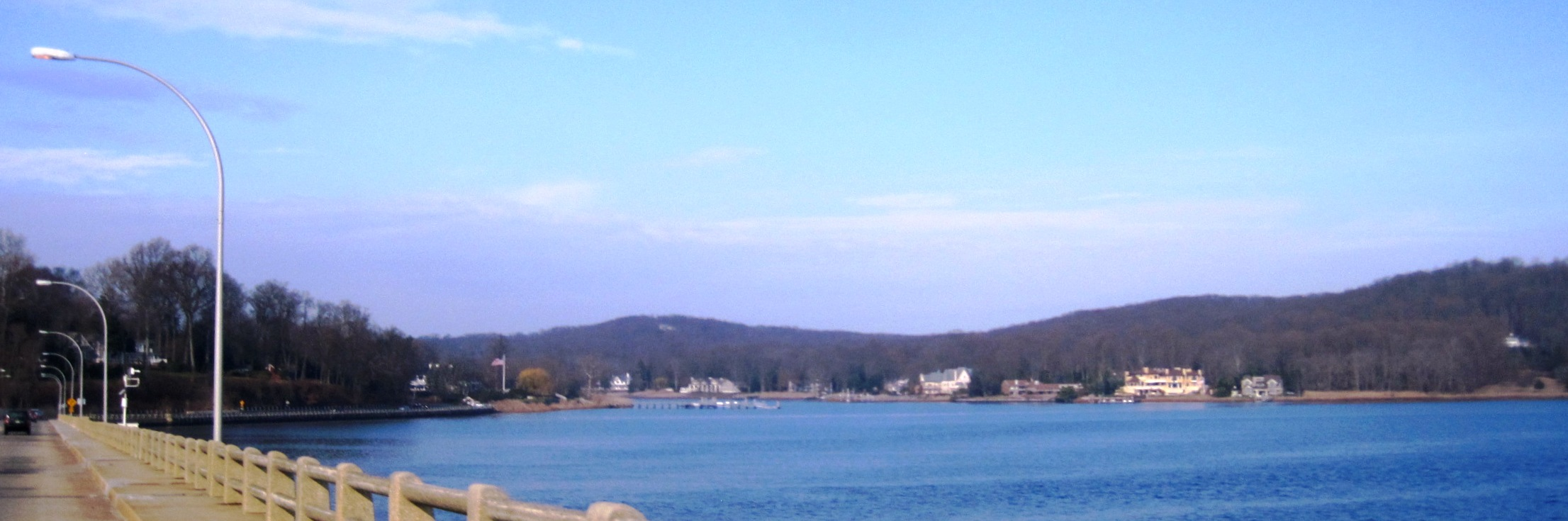
- Locust as seen from the Oceanic Bridge

- Location in Monmouth County. Inset: Location of county within the state of New Jersey Locust (New Jersey) Locust (the United States)
- Coordinates: 40°23′40″N 74°01′35″W
- Country: United States
- State: New Jersey
- County: Monmouth
- Township: Middletown
- Elevation: 23 ft (7.0 m)
- ZIP Code: 07760
- GNIS feature ID: 882494

Locust (also known as Locust Point) is an unincorporated community located within Middletown Township in Monmouth County, in the U.S. state of New Jersey. It is situated along the north banks of the Navesink River and Claypit Creek. Locust is one of the five designated historic districts in Middletown.

In the 18th century, Locust was a fishing and farming village. Oysters found in the Navesink River were considered a great delicacy. After the Civil War, Locust transformed into an area where well off New Yorkers spent their summers. The area consists of mostly medium-to-large sized houses throughout the hilly terrain of this part of the township.

The Oceanic Bridge over the Navesink River, constructed in 1939, connects Locust with Rumson to the south.

== Notable people ==
- Marian Estelle Melson Strack, socialite and antisemite
