= Kate Duncan Smith DAR School =

Location
- 6077 Main Street; Grant, Alabama 35747; United States; 34°32′0″N 86°15′11″W

Information
- Type: Public
- Established: 1924 (102 years ago)
- School district: Marshall County Schools
- CEEB code: 011285
- Grades: K-12
- Campus: 240 acres (97 ha)
- Campus type: Rural
- Nickname: Patriots
- Kate Duncan Smith Daughters of the American Revolution School
- U.S. National Register of Historic Places
- U.S. Historic district
- Location within Alabama Location within the United States
- Area: 15 acres (6.1 ha)
- Architect: Alfred, A.M.; Campbell, L.W.
- Architectural style: American Craftsman
- NRHP reference No.: 02000478
- Added to NRHP: October 2, 2002

The Kate Duncan Smith DAR School is a K-12 public school in Grant, Alabama.

== History ==
The school was established in 1924 and operates under a public-private partnership between the Marshall County School System and the National Society of the Daughters of the American Revolution. The historic core of campus covers 15 acres (6 ha) and contains 12 buildings, constructed between 1924 and 1957. Buildings are constructed in Craftsman style of local stone or logs. It is one of only two schools in the country (the other being the Tamassee DAR School in South Carolina) that is owned by the DAR. Following the end of World War II, DAR President General May Erwin Talmadge redistributed funds to the school from the DAR War Fund. The Doris White Auditorium and Gymnasium at the school, and it's endowment fund, were dedicated in honor of DAR President General Doris Pike White on October 24, 1961. The Jeannette Osborn Baylies Home Economics-Multi-Use Building was constructed in the 1970s.

The historic district was listed on the National Register of Historic Places in 2002.
