= Robert Lansing (disambiguation) =

Robert Lansing (1864–1928) was a U.S. Secretary of State

Robert Lansing may also refer to:

- Robert Lansing (actor) (1928–1994), American actor
- Robert Lansing (state senator) (1799–1878), New York politician
- SS Robert Lansing, a Liberty ship, named for the secretary of state
