= John W. Foster =

American diplomat, military officer, lawyer and journalist (1836–1917)

John Foster
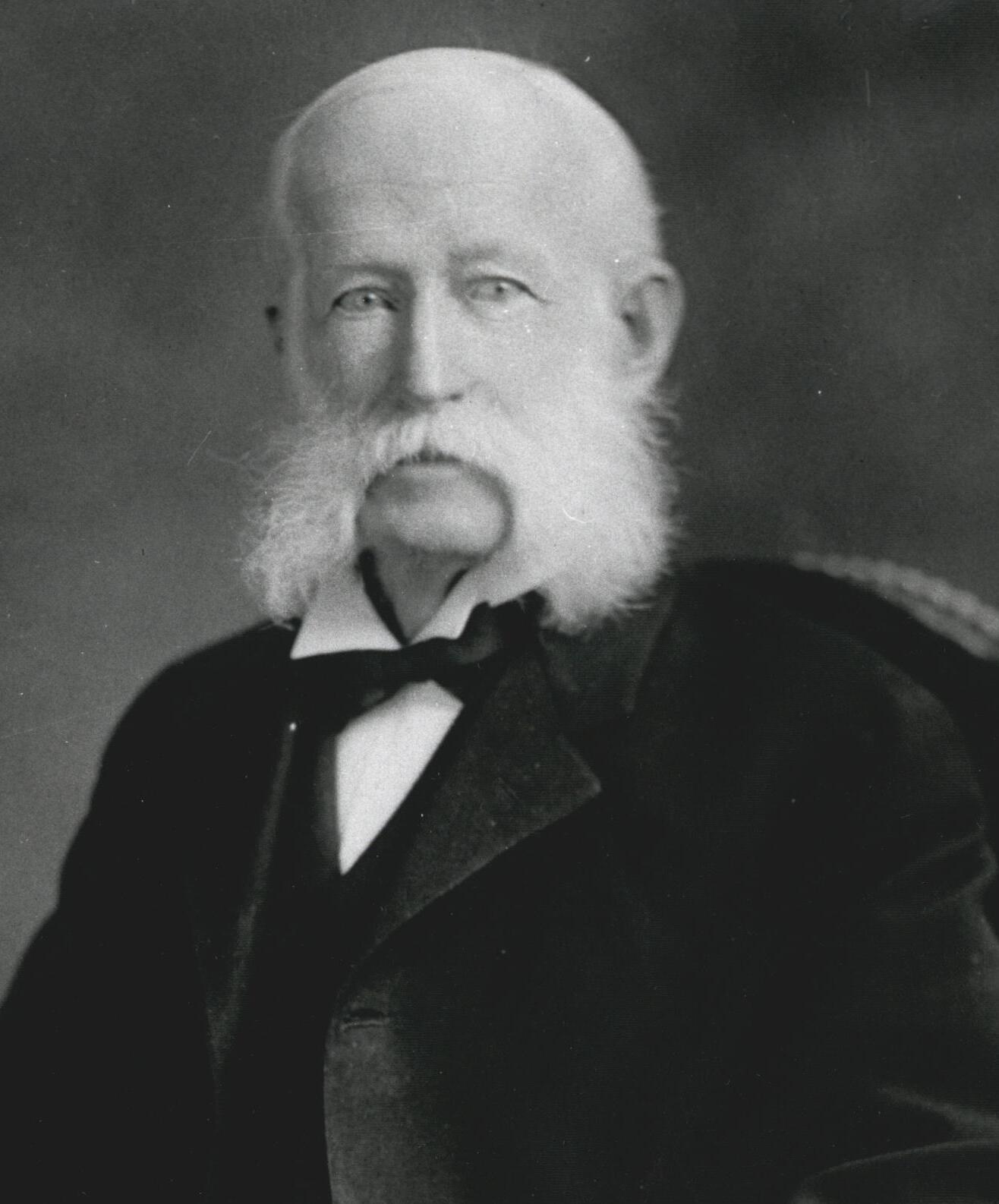

32nd United States Secretary of State
- In office June 29, 1892 – February 23, 1893
- President: Benjamin Harrison
- Preceded by: James G. Blaine
- Succeeded by: Walter Q. Gresham

24th United States Minister to Spain
- In office June 16, 1883 – August 28, 1885
- President: Chester A. Arthur; Grover Cleveland
- Preceded by: Hannibal Hamlin
- Succeeded by: Jabez Curry

United States Minister to Russia
- In office June 11, 1880 – August 1, 1881
- President: Rutherford B. Hayes; James A. Garfield
- Preceded by: Edwin W. Stoughton
- Succeeded by: William H. Hunt

United States Minister to Mexico
- In office June 16, 1873 – March 2, 1880
- President: Ulysses S. Grant; Rutherford B. Hayes
- Preceded by: Thomas H. Nelson
- Succeeded by: Philip H. Morgan

Personal details
- Born: John Watson Foster; March 2, 1836 Petersburg, Indiana, U.S.
- Died: November 15, 1917 (aged 81) Washington, D.C., U.S.
- Party: Republican
- Spouse: Mary Parke McFerson (m. 1859)
- Children: 2
- Education: Indiana University Bloomington (BA); Harvard University (LLB)

Military service
- Allegiance: United States • Union
- Branch/service: United States Army • Union Army
- Years of service: 1861–1865
- Rank: Colonel
- Unit: 25th Indiana Volunteer Infantry; 65th Indiana Volunteer Mounted Infantry; 136th Indiana Volunteer Infantry
- Battles/wars: American Civil War

John Watson Foster (March 2, 1836 – November 15, 1917) was an American diplomat, military officer, lawyer and journalist who was U.S. Secretary of State from 1892 to 1893, under President Benjamin Harrison. He was influential as a lawyer in technically private practice in the international relations sphere.

== Early life ==
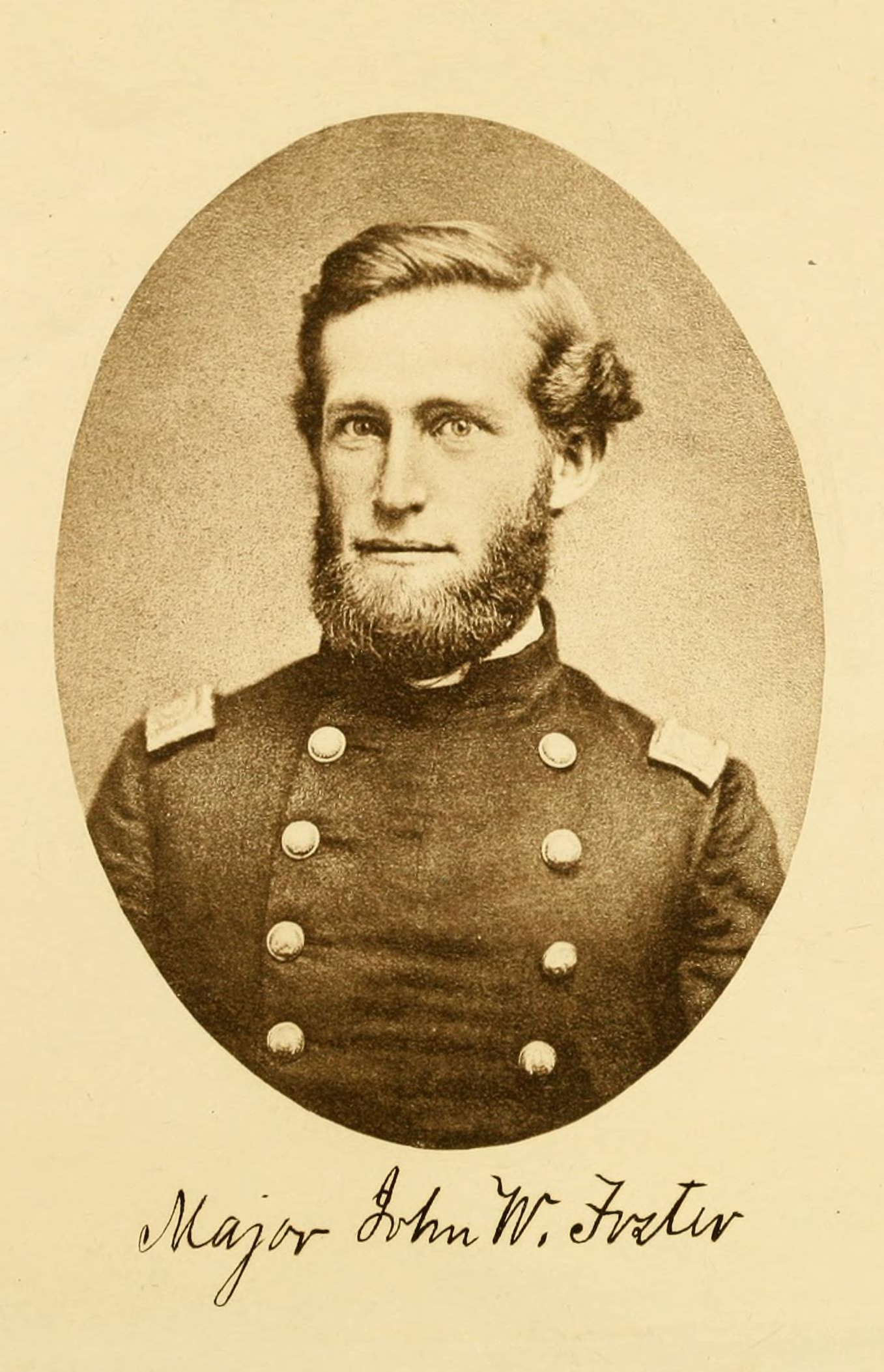
Major Foster during the Civil War

Foster was born on March 2, 1836, in Petersburg, Indiana, and raised in Evansville, Indiana. He was the son of Matthew Watson Foster, an Indiana farmer, merchant, and judge, and the former Eleanor Johnson. He graduated from the fledgling Indiana University Bloomington in 1855, but decided not to become a preacher as his parents hoped. Instead, Foster attended Harvard Law School, then moved to Cincinnati, Ohio, to begin his legal career.

In 1861, Foster volunteered in the Union Army in the American Civil War. Initially commissioned as a major, he rose to the rank of colonel, serving with the 25th Indiana Volunteer Infantry, the 65th Indiana Volunteer Mounted Infantry and the 136th Indiana Volunteer Infantry. Foster's troops became the first to enter Knoxville, Tennessee, after the successful campaign by General Ambrose Burnside.

Foster was a member of the Military Order of the Loyal Legion of the United States - a military society of officers who had served in the Union armed forces during the Civil War.

After the war, Foster returned to Indiana and (in addition to his legal practice) edited the Evansville Daily Journal. He used the paper to promote the Republican Party from 1865 to 1869.

== Washington career ==
Foster moved to Washington, D.C., under President Ulysses S. Grant, and had a summer home in Henderson Harbor, New York. As a reward for his political service after the Republican Party split in 1872 as a result of scandals and rampant corruption in Grant's first administration, which even reached Vice President Schuyler Colfax and had caused reformers to nominate Horace Greeley in futile opposition to Grant's second term, successive Republican Presidents Grant, Rutherford B. Hayes and James A. Garfield appointed Foster the U.S. Ambassador to Mexico (1873–1880), then to Russia (1880–1881). President Chester A. Arthur made Foster the United States Ambassador to Spain (1883–1885).

In Benjamin Harrison's administration, Foster served as a State Department "trouble shooter" before becoming Secretary of State for the final six months of Harrison's term (from June 29, 1892, to February 23, 1893). As such, Foster replaced James Gillespie Blaine, who had succumbed to Bright's disease, of which he later died. As Secretary of State, Foster "helped direct the overthrow of the Hawaiian monarchy."

After leaving public office, Foster remained in Washington and invented a new type of legal practice, lobbying for large "corporations seeking favors in Washington and chances to expand abroad." Foster also used his government and political contacts to secure legal fees as counsel to several foreign legations. He also continued to serve presidents part-time on diplomatic missions. As such, Foster negotiated trade agreements with eight countries, brokered a treaty with Britain and Russia concerning seal hunting in the Bering Sea, and negotiated one of the many unequal treaties between imperial powers and China, technically as legal consultant and commissioner for the Qing Dynasty, requiring China to cede land, pay reparations, open treaty ports, or grant extraterritorial privileges to foreign citizens.

Shortly before the Treaty of Shimonoseki ended the First Sino-Japanese War, Foster tried to convince Yuan Shikai to launch a military coup against the Qing dynasty.

In 1903, Foster published American diplomacy in the Orient, followed in 1904 by Arbitration and the Hague Court. In 1906, he wrote The practice of diplomacy as illustrated in the foreign relations of the United States. Foster wrote many other books.

He wrote the introduction of the first version of The Memoirs of Li Hung Chang, which was later revealed to be a forgery.

== Family ==
Foster married Mary Parke McFerson in 1859. Three of Foster's children never reached adulthood. Foster sent his son to Princeton. Foster doted on his daughters' grandchildren, regaling them with tales of life on the frontier as well as in foreign lands (of which he retained many curios). His daughter Edith Foster married Presbyterian minister Allen Macy Dulles, and their children included John Foster Dulles (who also became a U.S. Secretary of State) and Allen Welsh Dulles, (Director of Central Intelligence). Foster's daughter Eleanor married State Department legal advisor Robert Lansing (who later also served as U.S. Secretary of State); their niece Eleanor Lansing Dulles became an economist and diplomat. Foster was also the great-grandfather of the noted Catholic convert and theologian Cardinal Avery Dulles.

== Death and legacy ==
Foster died in Washington, D.C., on November 15, 1917. His body was returned to Evansville, Indiana, where it remains in Oak Hill Cemetery, which is listed on the National Register of Historic Places for Vanderburgh County.

Diplomatic posts
| Preceded by Thomas H. Nelson | U.S. Minister to Mexico; 1873–1880 | Succeeded by Philip H. Morgan |
| Preceded by Edwin W. Stoughton | U.S. Minister to Russia; 1880–1881 | Succeeded by William H. Hunt |
| Preceded by Hannibal Hamlin | U.S. Minister to Spain; 1883–1885 | Succeeded by Jabez L. M. Curry |
Political offices
| Preceded by James G. Blaine | U.S. Secretary of State; Served under: Benjamin Harrison; 1892–1893 | Succeeded by Walter Q. Gresham |
