= Mary Parke Foster =

Wife of US Secretary of State (1840–1922)

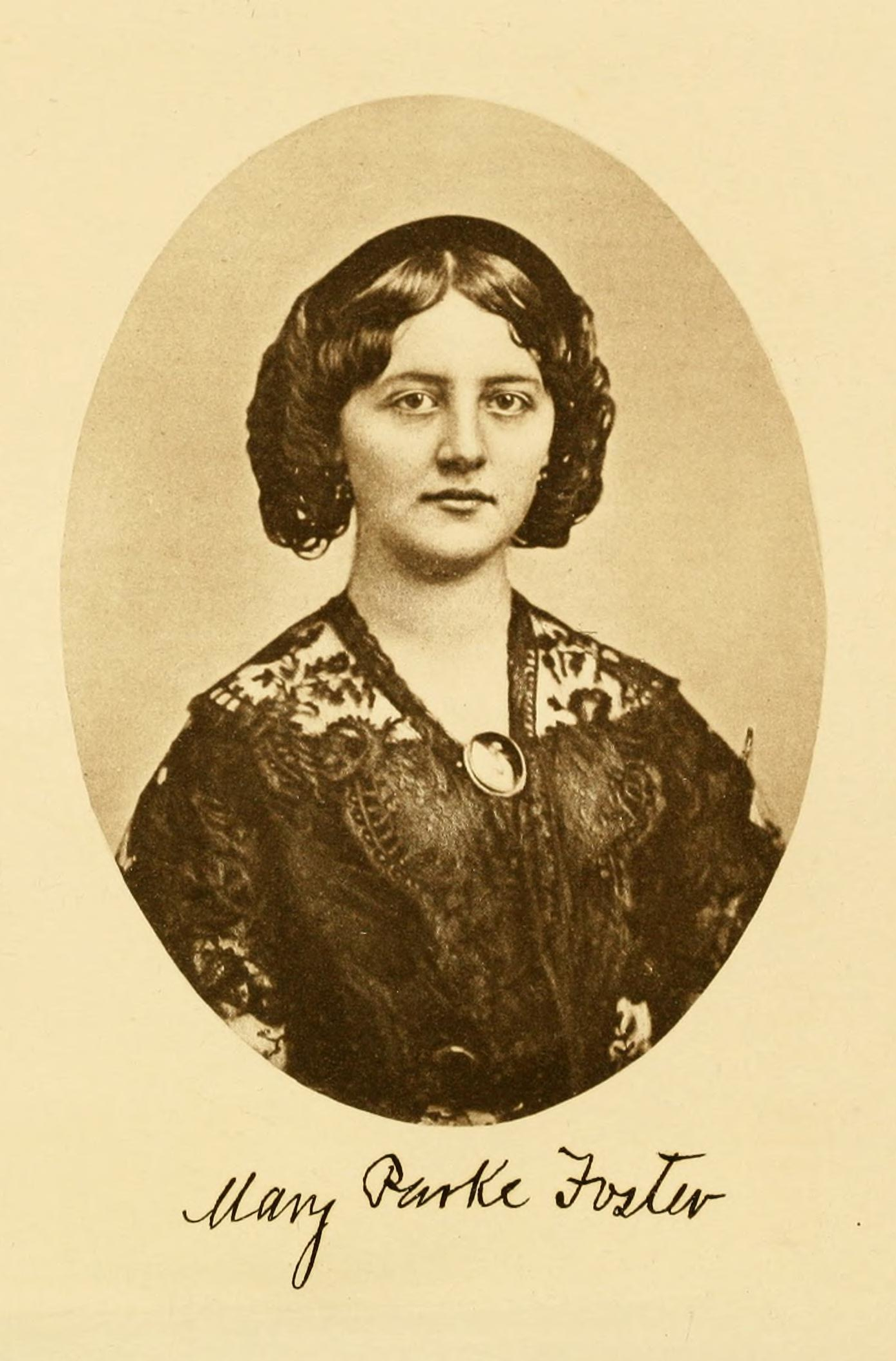
- Foster in a 1918 publication

3rd President General of the Daughters of the American Revolution
- In office 1895–1896
- Preceded by: Letitia Green Stevenson
- Succeeded by: Letitia Green Stevenson

Personal details
- Born: Mary Parke McFerson; August 14, 1840; Salem, Indiana, U.S.
- Died: June 18, 1922 (aged 81)
- Spouse: John W. Foster (m. 1859–1917)
- Relatives: Edith Foster (daughter); Eleanor Foster (daughter); Robert Lansing (son-in-law); Eleanor Lansing Dulles (granddaughter); John Foster Dulles (grandson); Allen Dulles (grandson)

Mary Parke Foster (née McFerson; August 14, 1840 – June 18, 1922) was the 3rd President General of the National Society Daughters of the American Revolution and wife of John W. Foster, U.S. Secretary of State under President Benjamin Harrison.

== Personal life ==
Mary Parke McFerson was born in Salem, Indiana, on August 14, 1840, the daughter of Rev. Alexander McFerson and Eliza Reed. She died on June 18, 1922, and is buried at Oak Hill Cemetery in Evansville, Indiana. She graduated from Glendale Female College near Cincinnati, Ohio.

She married John Watson Foster in 1859 and they had three daughters, two of whom lived to adulthood: Edith Foster, who married Allen Macy Dulles, and Eleanor Foster, who married Robert Lansing. She traveled with her husband around the world, to countries including Mexico, Russia, France, and Spain. She and her husband were members of the Church of the Covenant, a Presbyterian Church which formerly stood on the southeast corner of Connecticut Avenue and N Street NW.

== DAR membership ==
Mary Foster joined the DAR in 1891, a Charter Member of the Mary Washington Chapter in Washington, D.C. Before being elected DAR President General, she served as Vice President General from 1892 to 1893.

She served as DAR President General for a single one-year term and presided over the 5th Continental Congress. She declined a nomination of a second term so that her predecessor, Letitia Green Stevenson, could serve as President General again. During her administration, funds were approved for the Prison Ship Martyrs Monument in Fort Greene Park in Fort Greene, Brooklyn, New York, and restoration work in Jamestown, Virginia.

She promoted the marking of Revolutionary War graves and the DAR's American History Essay Contest. Mrs. Foster represented the DAR at the Cotton States and International Exposition. During her administration, the DAR grew: Chapters were organized for the first time in the states of Colorado, Louisiana, Texas, and Washington; the Office of Librarian General was created; and Mrs. Foster encouraged the DAR to create the office of First Vice President General, though this would not occur until 1941.

During her administration, the DAR was incorporated by an official U.S. Congressional Act, under H.R. 3553 of the 54th Congress of the United States of America. They were recognized as an administrative and legal entity "for patriotic, historical, and educational purposes, to perpetuate the memory and spirit of the men and women who achieved American independence", with real estate in Washington, D.C. The act required them to report their proceedings annually to the United States Congress via the Secretary of the Smithsonian Institution.
