= Peace efforts during World War I =

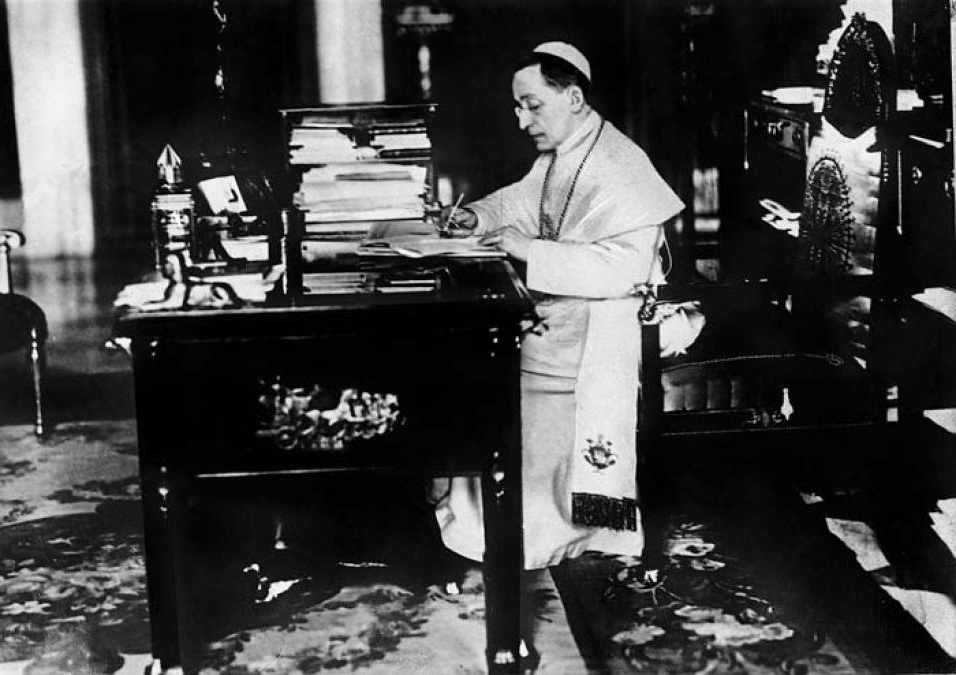
Pope Benedict XV, one of the protagonists in the peace negotiations during World War I

Peace efforts during World War I were made mainly by Pope Benedict XV, US President Woodrow Wilson and, from 1916, the two main members of the Triple Alliance (Germany and Austria-Hungary) to bring the conflict to an end. European socialists, taking advantage of their relations on opposing sides through the Political International, also tried to open up the prospect of peace.

Even though the various social groups in the belligerent countries grew tired of the war after 1916 (the Battle of Verdun, which claimed more than 300,000 lives, marked a turning point in the war), peace proposals were aimed more at protecting national interests than at securing a lasting peace between the belligerents. The historian Jean-Baptiste Duroselle uses the term "secret negotiations" rather than attempts at peace.

None of the attempts at peace succeeded, such as those by Austrian Emperor Charles I and mediated by Sixtus of Bourbon-Parma and all triggered waves of controversy, demonstrating their ambivalent nature. The peace demonstrations of 1918 were the last signs of the general will to make peace. Peace efforts were most often led by politicians or private individuals who were not, or were no longer, in power: Aristide Briand, in 1917, was no longer President of the Council, or Sixtus of Bourbon-Parma, then serving in the Belgian army, which enabled governments and leaders to avoid losing face in the event of failure. But it was indeed Belgian King Albert I who was pushing for peace, just as Aristide Briand was doing in France. The aim was to obtain from Germany the full restoration of Belgian independence and the return of Alsace-Lorraine to France. But German intransigence dashed all hopes, as the Austro-Hungarian Foreign Minister Czernin, a German ally, sabotaged the peace attempt by publicly revealing the existence of a letter from French Prime Minister Clemenceau. Clemenceau strongly denied this, while the Belgian Foreign Minister, Charles de Broqueville, resigned.

At the end of the war, Germany, judged by the Allies to be responsible for the war, was confronted with its responsibilities, including the failure of peace attempts, a confrontation that quickly turned into a nationalist revision. The study of peace efforts is a predominantly German field of research, within the broader scope of the war guilt question.

== The first negotiations in 1915 ==
=== German separate peace proposal to Serbia ===
In September 1915, Germany sent an envoy to propose a separate peace agreement to Serbia, with certain territorial enlargements around Durres and surrounding territories.

== The first negotiations in 1916 ==
=== German peace proposals ===
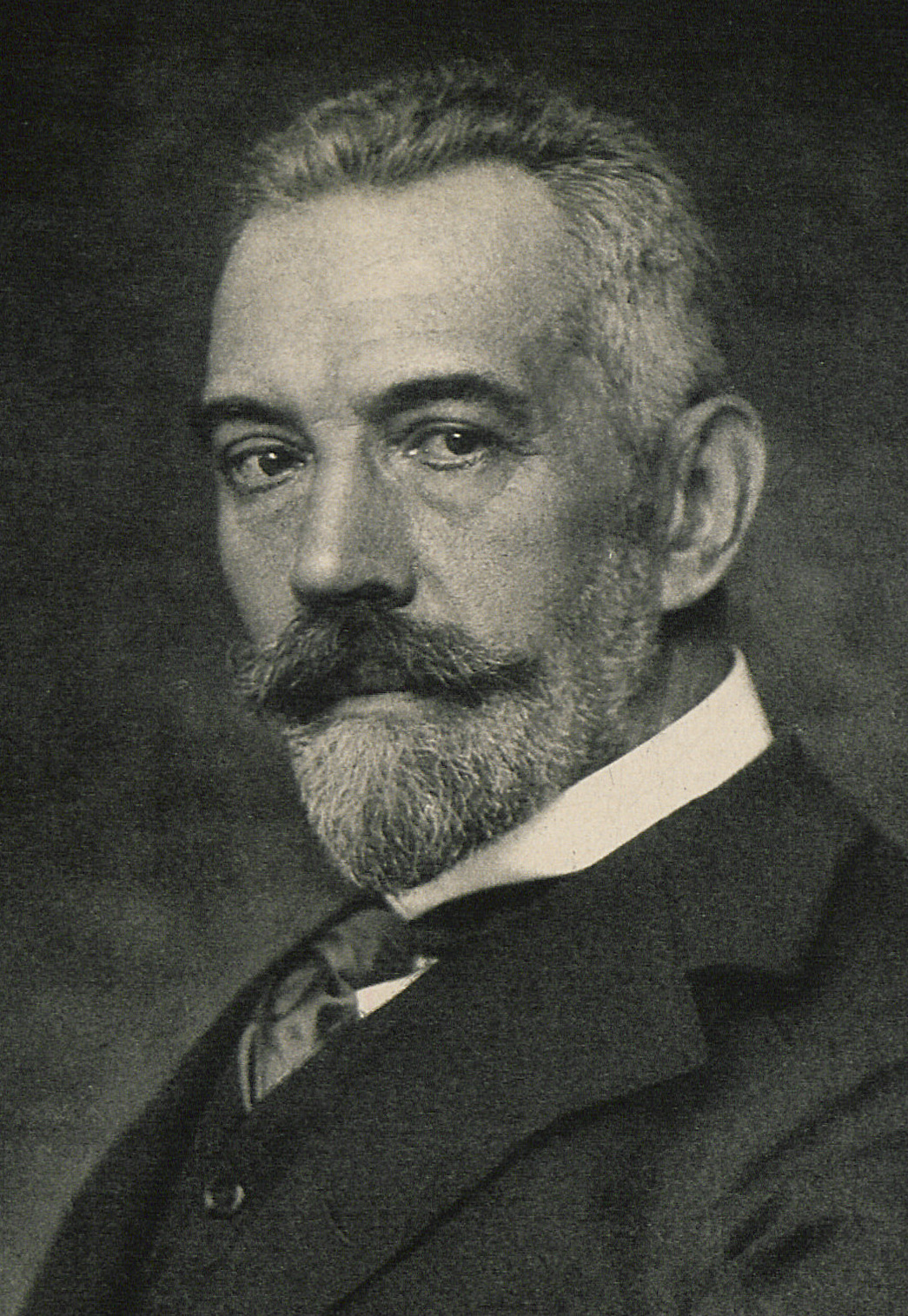
Theobald von Bethmann Hollweg

In 1916, Germany's domestic situation was becoming increasingly worrying due to supply difficulties caused by labor shortages.

Faced with the indecision of the White House, Imperial German Chancellor Theobald von Bethmann Hollweg decided to make his own peace proposal, seeing it as the last chance for a just peace, as the outcome of the war was, in his view, unfavorable to Germany. On December 12, 1916, once Romania had been largely conquered, Bethmann Hollweg proposed peace negotiations in the Reichstag on behalf of the Central Powers. Wilhelm II supported his chancellor, whose proposal he saw as a "moral act necessary to free the world from the burden that weighs on all."

The haughty tone of the note, its content and the fact that Germany showed no willingness to evacuate the occupied territories made it unacceptable to the Allies. The Allies' reply of December 30, 1916 spoke of an unconditional suggestion that was not a peace proposal, but rather a war maneuver.

In Berlin, it was thought that if the enemy refused the proposal, it would be they who would have to bear the consequences of continuing the war, especially the use of unrestricted submarine warfare. In this way, Germany attempted to absolve itself, and after the failure of this peace action, the Reich considered justified the tougher conduct of the war.

=== The rise of pacifism on the German left ===
In 1916-1917, nineteen SPD deputies refused to vote for additional war funding, resulting in eighteen of them being expelled from the party. In 1917, they founded the Independent Social Democratic Party of Germany (USPD).

=== Wilson's proposal ===
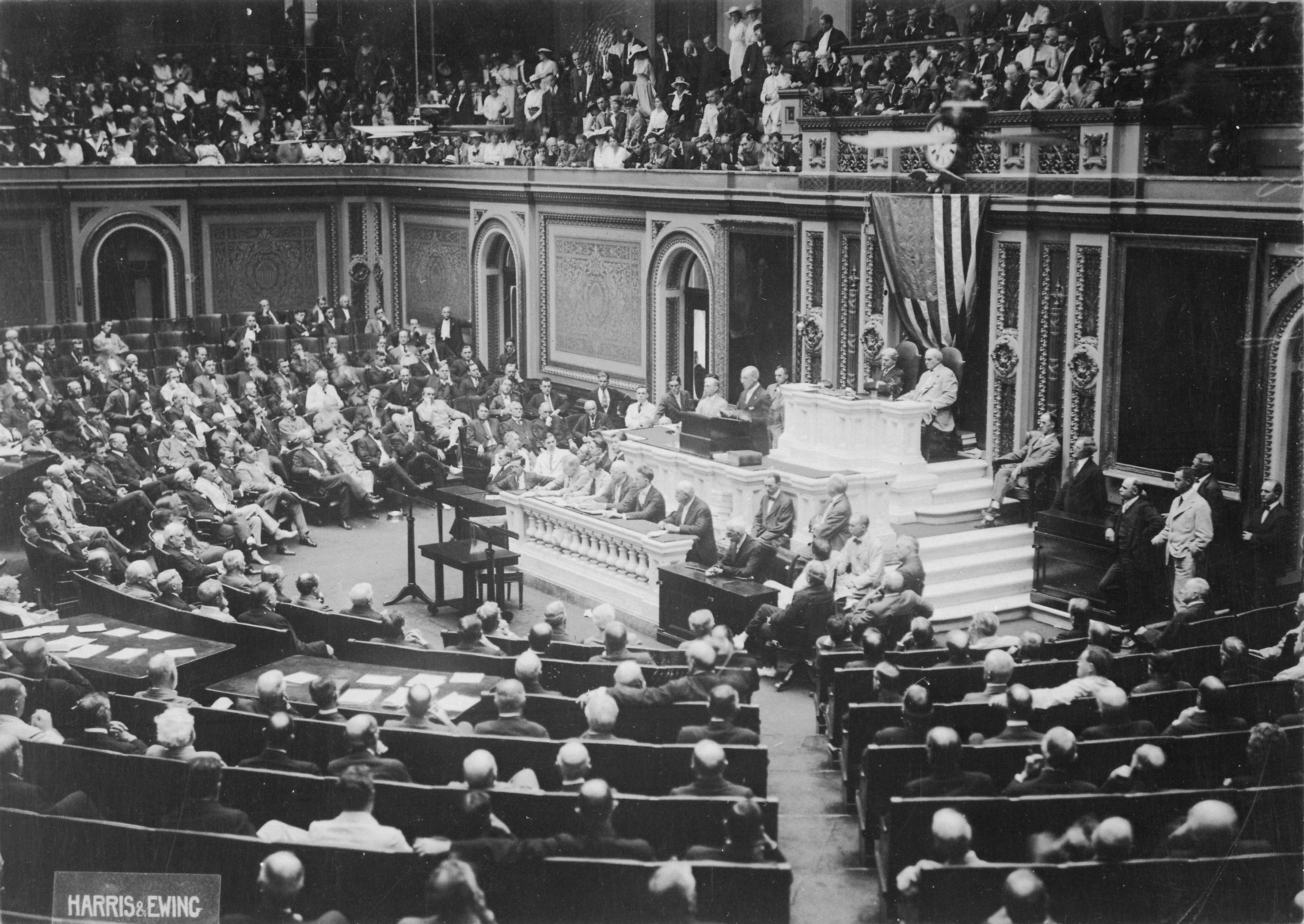
Wilson declares the rupture of diplomatic ties with Germany.

In parallel with the action of the Central Powers, US President Wilson sent a note to all the belligerents on December 18, 1916. He asked them to specify their war aims and presented himself as an intermediary between the countries. But Germany, opposed to any American mediation, also refused to specify its war aims, and rejected the proposal on December 26.

On January 7, 1917, Bethmann Hollweg threatened to introduce unrestricted submarine warfare. The warning was carried out two days later. On January 10, 1917, the Entente presented its peace terms to President Wilson. Wilson considered them overly ambitious. In addition to restoring the rights of Serbia, Montenegro and Belgium, the Allies demanded the evacuation of occupied or annexed territories such as Alsace-Lorraine. Wilson then turned his attention to the project of creating an international league after the war, advocating a "peace without victory" or "compromise peace".

On January 31, 1917, the German Chancellor addressed a new note to President Wilson. For him, peace depended on accepting a policy of German annexation.

=== Negotiations with Japan ===
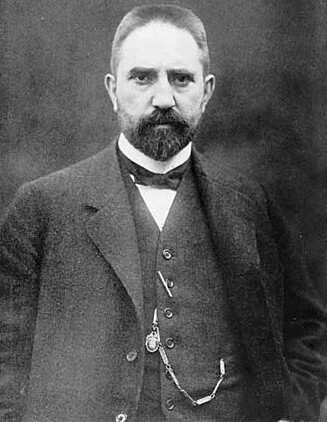
Hugo Stinnes

It was also during 1916 that Germany began negotiations with Japan. The aim of these negotiations was to secure a separate peace with Emperor Taishō, who had entered the war on the side of the Allies on August 23, 1914. As early as January 1915, however, Germany had tried to persuade Japan to join its cause through the German ambassador to Beijing, Paul von Hintze. Germany offered Japan freedom of action for its expansion in East Asia, even going so far as to offer financial support for the conquest of China. Between January 19 and mid-March 1916, the German ambassador to Sweden, Hellmuth von Lucius, was commissioned by Chancellor Bethmann Hollweg to hold secret talks with the Japanese ambassador Uchida. The negotiations, centered on cooperation between the two countries in China, took a favorable turn: Japan agreed not to send troops to Europe but hesitated to join the German side. At the same time, Germany tried to conduct negotiations with Russia, the latter in turn informing Japan.

Negotiations in Stockholm came to a halt and resumed on March 25, 1916, between Uchida and German representatives, most notably the industrialist Hugo Stinnes. The State Secretary for the Reichsmarine, Alfred von Capelle, and the Kronprinz supported these initiatives. Japan, as an intermediary, was to lead the negotiations to achieve peace between Germany, Russia and itself. Japan soon revealed the content of the secret discussions to the United Kingdom, but continued the talks. It wanted peace with Germany in exchange for the Chinese city of Qingdao, then under German domination, but offered to mediate a peace with Russia if the Japanese-German peace was not concluded. Germany agreed to transfer its sovereignty in the Pacific to Japan, but at the price of peace with Russia.

By revealing the content of its discussions with Germany, Japan opened a bidding war with the Allies for even greater concessions. However, for the Allies, if Germany wished to make peace with Japan, it must also make proposals to the four great Entente powers: Great Britain, France, Russia and Japan. Negotiations between Japan and Germany continued, but failed. Lucius puts an end to negotiations on August 23. Japan signed a defense agreement with Russia in the person of Sazonov on July 3, 1916, and German suspicions, particularly those of Gottlieb von Jagow, that the Empire of the Rising Sun was playing a double game, proved justified.

== The various negotiations and appeals of 1917 ==
=== Charles I and the Sixtus Affair ===
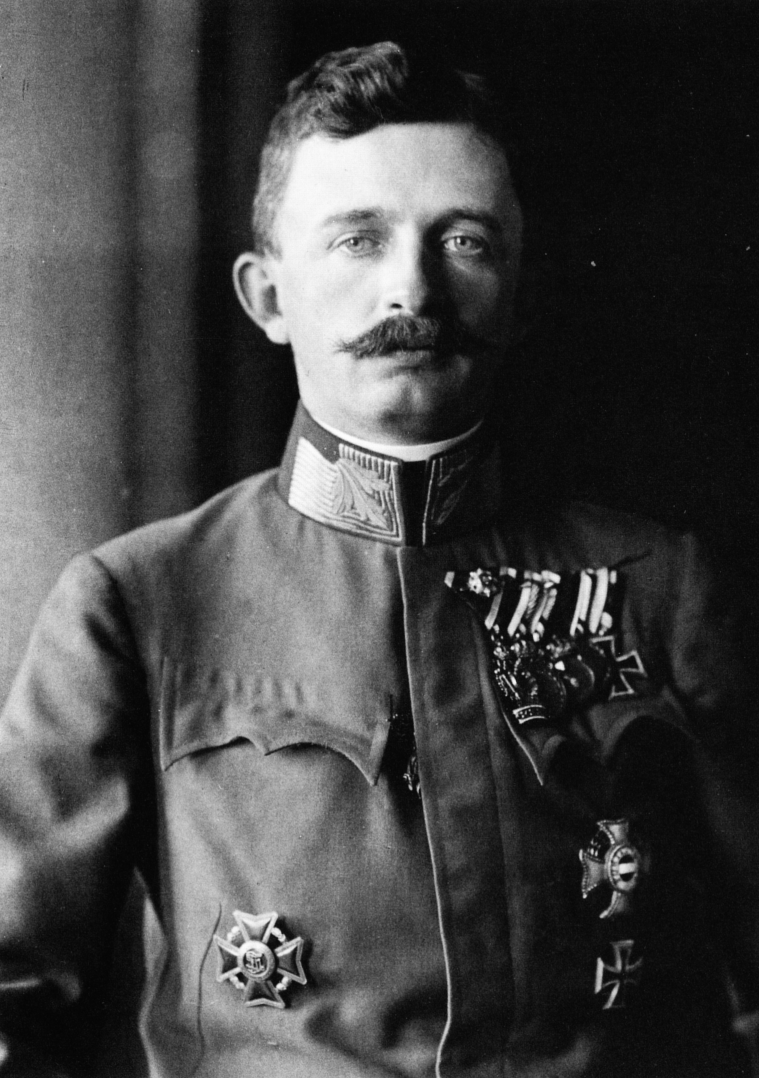
Emperor-King Charles I of Austria in 1917

As soon as he took office on November 21, 1916, the young Emperor-King Charles I, who had experienced the reality of the front, tried to make peace proposals to the Triple Entente, establishing further dialogues through his brothers-in-law, Princes Sixtus and Xavier of Bourbon-Parme, then officers in the Belgian army. Although the publication of secret German documents later showed otherwise, in March 1917 German Chancellor Theobald von Bethmann Hollweg had asserted his readiness to renounce Alsace-Lorraine, then annexed to the German Empire. On March 24, Charles I wrote in a letter that he would "support France's demands for restitution of Alsace-Lorraine by using all his personal influence on his allies."

The two Princes of Bourbon-Parme took the letter to French President Raymond Poincaré, who informed King George V of the United Kingdom. A second letter followed on May 9. The Austrian Foreign Minister Ottokar Czernin was informed of the peace attempt, but did not know the content of the letters. In a new proposal, Charles I was ready to put pressure on Germany to return Alsace-Lorraine to France, and to put the world to rights about Serbia occupied by Austria-Hungary. However, he refused to lose any of his empire's territories. For example, he refused to cede South Tyrol or Trentino to Italy, even though the Allies had promised Rome their support on this territorial issue

In the months that followed, Charles I's negotiations were increasingly held up by his own Foreign Minister, Count Czernin, who believed in an Austro-German military victory. On April 2, 1918, Czernin delivered a speech to the Vienna City Council in which he accused France of having prevented any peace negotiations by demanding the return of Alsace-Lorraine. The speech appeared on the front page of the Fremden-Blatt newspaper the following day, but as Czernin's account of the facts was untrue, Georges Clemenceau had Charles I's first letter published on April 12, 1918. The latter was then obliged to deny the concessions made to France, in particular the passages on Alsace-Lorraine and Belgium, probably under pressure from Czernin. The latter denied any knowledge of the letter, leaving his sovereign to face his allies alone. On April 16, 1918, Czernin was dismissed.

The negotiations became mired in blatant amateurism, with the United States Secretary of State Robert Lansing describing Clemenceau's approach as "a piece of the most astounding stupidity." Lansing deplored the mess made by Clemenceau, who truly believed that peace was possible. Charles I's actions were motivated by his Catholic convictions in favor of peace, both externally: to put an end to the war; and internally: to avoid a revolution, with all its implications for the suffering of the people. The fear of revolution is reflected in his letter to Wilhelm II: "If the monarchs do not make peace, the people will." The Allies' recognition of the right of peoples to self-determination, in the fullest and most radical sense of the word, signaled the downfall of the multinational state of Austria-Hungary.

==== The Neuchâtel negotiations in 1917 ====
In early 1917, in a Europe at war, emissaries of the Austrian-Hungarian Emperor Charles I secretly negotiated a separate peace with the Triple Entente, particularly France, in Neuchâtel. The emissaries were Empress Zita's brothers, Sixtus and Xavier of Bourbon-Parma. They were welcomed, almost unexpectedly, by Maurice Boy de la Tour, in his sumptuous home on Rue du Pommier 7 in Neuchâtel, Switzerland. This home was the discreet place where news arrived from Paris (where Sixtus was negotiating with the French authorities) and Vienna (via Thomas Erdödy, private secretary to Charles I). During the summer, the Austro-Hungarian foreign minister, a Germanophile, would derail the negotiations. During the princes' six visits to Neuchâtel, Maurice Boy de la Tour remained friends with them until the end of his life in 1930.

Neither the Confederation nor the State were informed of these secret dealings, so the documents relating to this affair are not to be found in the public archives, but in the private Boy de la Tour collection.

=== The Reichstag peace resolution of 1917 ===
With the outbreak of Unrestricted submarine warfare on February 1, 1917, the Imperial German Army's plan to force England to sign a peace treaty within six months failed. The peace resolution marked the Reichstag's first attempt to intervene in political events during the war, but was resolutely opposed by the Michaelis government. But on July 17, 1917, the German Reichstag proclaimed a peace resolution (Friedensresolution) calling for a conciliatory peace to end the war. The resolution tabled by MPs Erzberger, David, Ebert and Scheidemann was accepted by 216 votes (SPD, Zentrum and Progressive People's Party) to 126 (USPD, National Liberal Party and Conservatives).

The peace resolution was not synonymous with renunciation of war aims. Raymond Poidevin points out that "German leaders do not intend to renounce a victorious peace." Indeed, the deputies affirmed that the Germans would continue to fight as long as Germany and its allies were "invaded and violated."

=== The role of Benedict XV ===
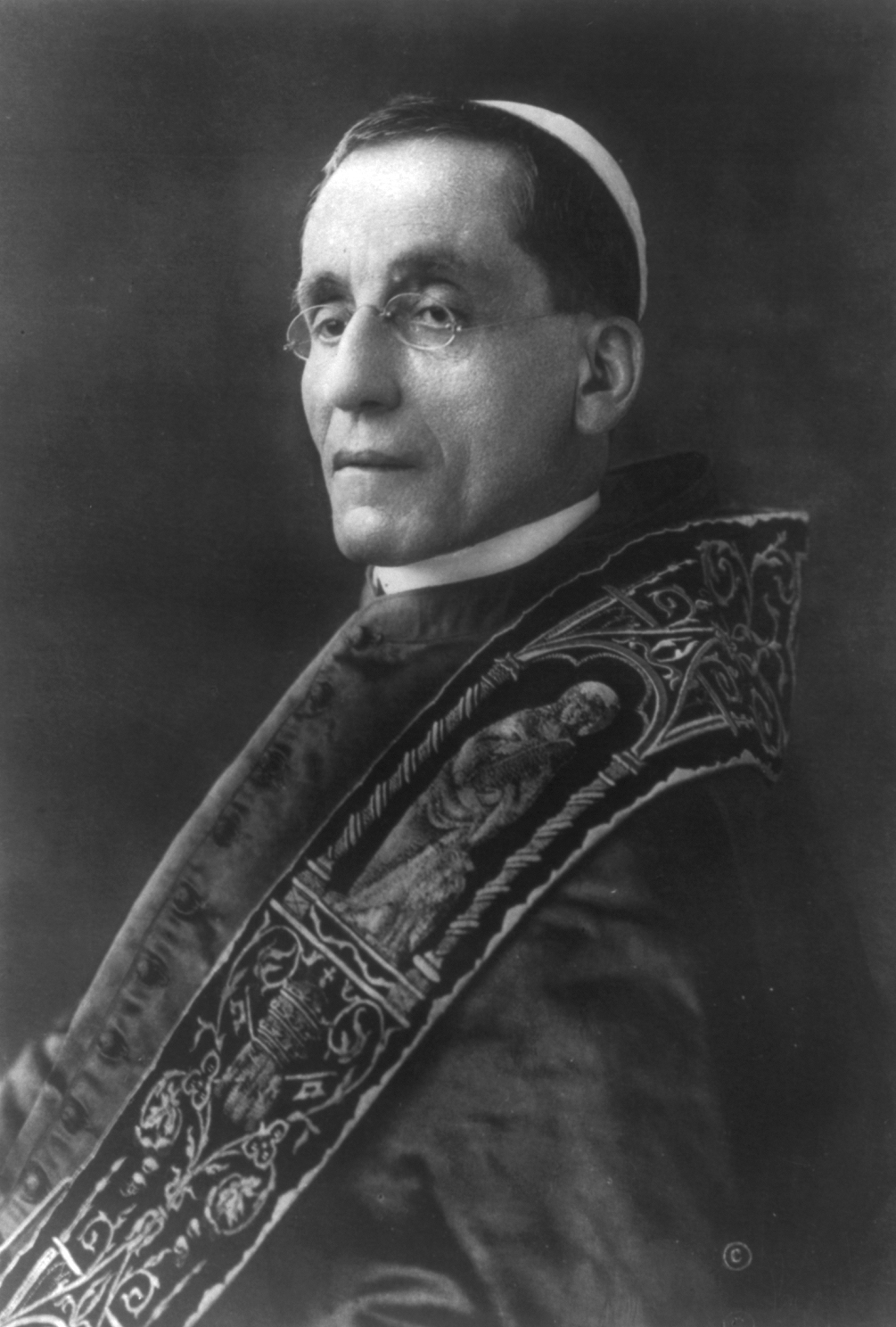
Benedict XV

In his inaugural encyclical Ad beatissimi Apostolorum principis of All Saints' Day 1914, Benedict XV called for an end to the war: "We have therefore addressed heartfelt prayers to Princes and rulers, so that, considering how many tears and blood war has already shed, they may hasten to restore to their peoples the precious benefits of peace." In contrast to his humanitarian actions, the Pope's political initiatives remained unsuccessful. The Holy See had urged a guarantee that Belgium's rights would be restored, but Germany responded only by alluding to the Belgian question. On July 24, 1917, the Apostolic Nuncio in Munich, Eugenio Pacelli, the future Pius XII, made a peace proposal to Chancellor Georg Michaelis and Foreign Minister Arthur Zimmermann, providing for the restitution of the German colonies and the evacuation of Belgium and the occupied French territories. Pope Benedict XV was approached by Charles I in order to obtain his support, but he was not involved in the Sixtus Affair negotiations.

Before Germany could respond, Pope Benedict XV sent a note of peace on August 1, 1917, which arrived officially a fortnight later and is known by its opening words: "From the beginning". It provides for the "reciprocal restitution of all occupied territories, in particular the total evacuation of Belgium with the assurance of its complete political, military and economic independence from any power, as well as the restitution of the German colonies", but also "the examination of the remaining territorial questions as between Austria-Hungary and Italy, as between Germany and France, in a spirit of reconciliation and in the measure of what is just and possible." The Pope also called for disarmament and for an effective international court of justice to prevent future wars. Jean-Baptiste Duroselle considers that these proposals remain very vague, and no serious negotiations leading to peace have resulted from them. The official German reply of September 13, 1917 to the Curia avoided any concrete proposals or compromises on the specific issues, and confined itself to vague appeals for peace.

The reasons for the failure of the Pope's peace policy are manifold. While the various appeals could not lead to concrete negotiations due to their vague nature, the Papacy had been isolated in Germany since 1870. In 1905, France had voted for the separation of Church and State, and it was only gradually that the "French Pope", as Ludendorff called him, was able to ease the situation. As part of the Italian demands for its rallying to the Entente in 1915, the Kingdom of Italy had requested the exclusion of the Pope from all future peace negotiations, even though the Pope wished to take part in future peace conferences. Each side suspected the Pope of secretly being on the other side. Georges Clemenceau, whose anti-Catholicism explains his rejection of peace proposals from the Pope and Emperor Charles of Austria, called Benedict XV "the Boche Pope." The German episcopate countered the pontifical commitment in the person of the Archbishop of Cologne, Cardinal Felix von Hartmann, who considered that the Pope had spoken as an international sovereign and not as the supreme shepherd of Catholics. Similarly, in France, Father Antonin-Gilbert Sertillanges of the Order of Friars Preachers challenged the Pope's attempts at peace in front of the whole of Paris during a sermon in the Church La Madeleine.

=== More secret negotiations ===
==== The Briand-Lancken affair ====
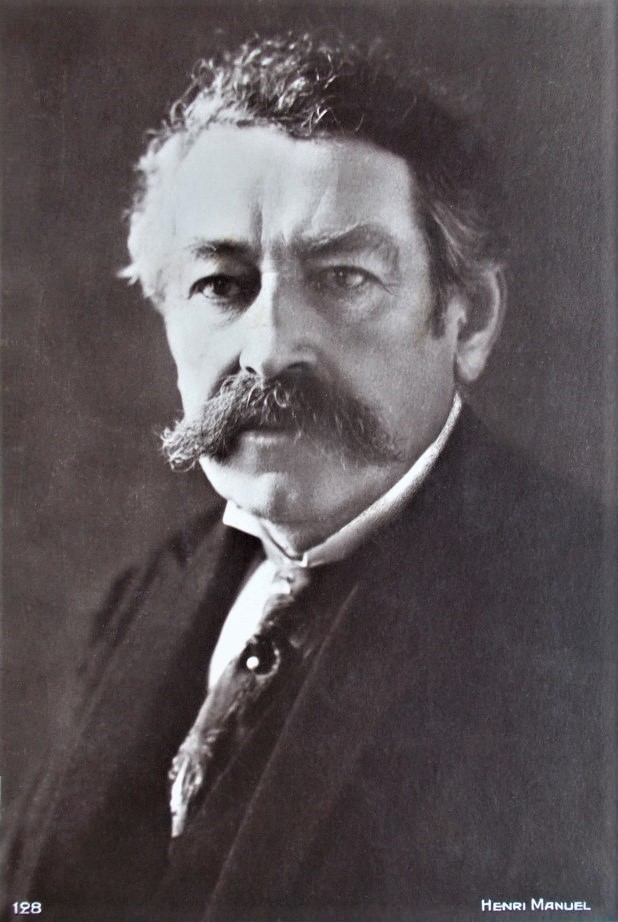
Aristide Briand

The secret Briand-Lancken affair was one of the last attempts at peace, the beginnings of which can be traced back to January 1917. Baron Von Lancken, head of the General Government of Belgium under German authority, had the support of Chancellor Bethmann Hollweg to conduct negotiations with Aristide Briand, then President of the Council and Minister of Foreign Affairs in France.

Pauline de Mérode, wife of Belgian senator Werner de Mérode, acted as intermediary between Count de Broqueville, the Belgian Prime Minister exiled in Le Havre, and Von Lancken, for whom Belgium could be an intermediary in peace negotiations. Briand, cautious on the advice of Poincaré, asked for the promise of the return of Alsace-Lorraine to France as a precondition for such negotiations.

The Barons Coppée, who had put Broqueville and Lancken in contact, announced that the Reich might consider returning the departments annexed in 1871 to France, which was clearly untrue, as the Germans declared themselves ready to cede only the tiny territory of Thann. Pauline de Mérode was then asked by King Albert I to prepare a meeting between Briand and Von Lancken. Briand was actually preparing to meet Lancken in September (the date was set for the 22nd), but he sensed opposition from his Finance Minister, Alexandre Ribot, and the Allies. Briand did not keep the appointment, and the negotiations were aborted before they could begin, even though they were bound to fail, given the irreconcilable positions of Belgium, France and Germany.

==== Revertera-Armand and Smuts-Mensdorff ====
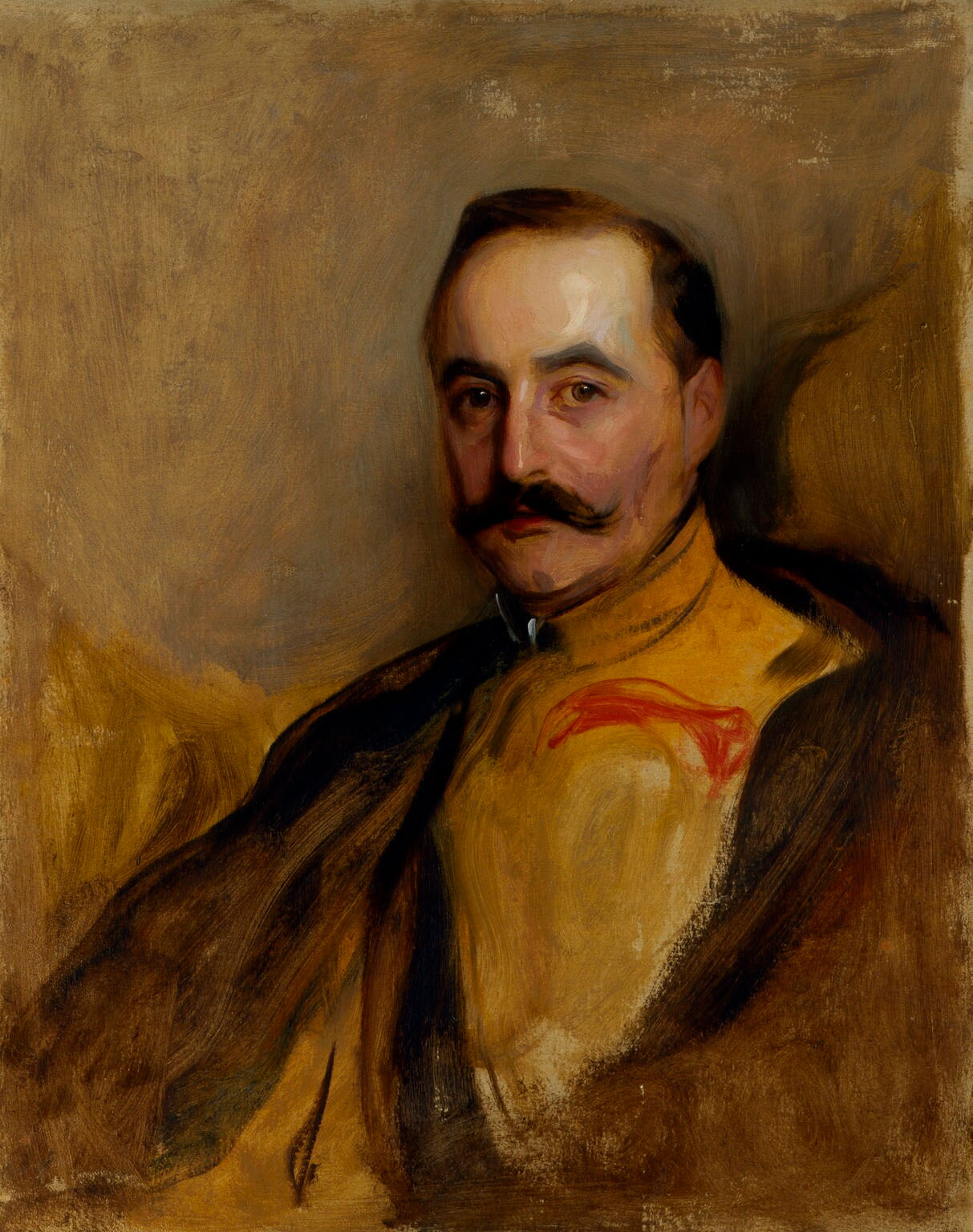
Albert von Mensdorff

From June to July 1917, at the same time as those led by Sixtus of Bourbon-Parme, further peace negotiations took place between Counts Nikolaus Revertera and Abel Armand, then a captain in the 2nd Bureau of the French General Staff. Both men had the confidence of their camp: Revertera was appointed by Czernin and Armand was chosen by the army. Great Britain agreed to lead the negotiations, which Clemenceau used to sound out the opposing camp, casting doubt on their sincerity from the outset. Important territorial clauses were discussed. France offered the Austrians Bavaria, Silesia and a reunited Poland within its 1772 borders. Berlin's concerns led to the collapse of the negotiations, which, in France's view, would have preserved Austria-Hungary as a "counterweight to Germany."

These negotiations brought together Great Britain and Austria-Hungary, represented respectively by General Jan Smuts and the former Austrian ambassador to London, Albert von Mensdorff. Bethmann Hollweg and Czernin had consulted each other in mid-March 1917 and agreed on Mensdorff's mission. Great Britain was looking for a counterweight to Germany's expansionist policy, and Austria-Hungary proved interesting.

Great Britain wanted a separate peace with Austria-Hungary to compensate for the Russian Empire's exit from the Entente. As for Mensdorff, there was no question of him broaching the subject of a separate peace, and territorial integrity had to be preserved. If Serbia and Montenegro were restored, Austria-Hungary demanded guarantees against unrest, and the Serbian Karađorđević dynasty must not be reinstalled in power. Moreover, Austria-Hungary did not want to be cut off from Germany.

== 1918 and the last attempts ==
=== Separate peace from Russia ===
As the war drew to a close, the weariness and exhaustion of the population became even more apparent. The workers' strikes of the previous years gained in momentum. From January 14 to 20, 1918, a major strike movement spread across Austria-Hungary, a country on the "brink of collapse." Riots broke out throughout the Dual Monarchy. Strikes began in Germany on January 28, and in France in May. Some 500,000 German workers went on strike.

Following the revolutions of 1917, which revealed the Russian population's war fatigue, the desire for peace was omnipresent in the country. As soon as they came to power, the Soviets ratified a peace decree on October 26, 1917 (November 8 in the Gregorian calendar), and Leon Trotsky proposed a general peace. The Bolsheviks wanted a "peace without annexation or indemnity." Negotiations began on December 22, 1917, at a time when Germany controlled a large part of western Russia. Diplomatic relations between the two regimes deteriorated when Germany signed a peace agreement with Ukraine, which had seceded from Russia, on February 9, 1918. Military operations even resumed on February 18. Not wishing to lose the benefits of the revolution, the Russians were forced to sign a separate peace on March 3, 1918, at Brest-Litovsk, renouncing numerous territories. This put an end to the war on the Eastern Front, leaving Germany free to focus on a new offensive in the West.

=== Final attempts ===
At the same time, in the spring of 1918, discussions were taking place in The Hague between General von Haeften and representatives of the American embassy. The American conditions were too unfavorable to Germany for the negotiations to succeed.

Some final negotiations were held. George D. Herron, an American observer based in Switzerland, maintained contacts with a large number of personalities. In 1918, with Wilson's agreement, he led negotiations with Bulgaria in the person of Teodor Šipkov with a view to signing a separate peace. Šipkov's sincerity was soon called into question by Herron and their discussions soon turned sour. After the war, Šipkov recounted that the Americans had promised unification of the country from Dobroudja to the mouth of the Danube, the whole of Thrace and Macedonia, as well as a corridor with Hungary and financial aid, which Herron refuted. Negotiations therefore failed. On September 15, 1918, following military operations in the Salonica region, the Allies opened the road to Bulgaria. Bulgarian Prime Minister Malinov tried to conclude an armistice, but in vain. On September 29, 1918, Bulgaria signed the armistice marking its defeat.

In parallel with his negotiations with Bulgaria, Herron opened talks with Austrian minister Heinrich Lammasch, who had been a peace activist in the Austrian Reichsrat since 1917 and had opposed the Austro-Hungarian ultimatum to Serbia in 1914. Lammasch was inclined to accept Wilson's Fourteen Points and, while not supporting independence for the Empire's minorities, proposed the federalization of Austria. Emperor Charles I was prepared to accept American intervention in the reshaping of the Empire, but Wilson eventually rejected the Austro-Hungarian proposal.

== Attempts at peace and responsibility for the outbreak and continuation of the conflict ==
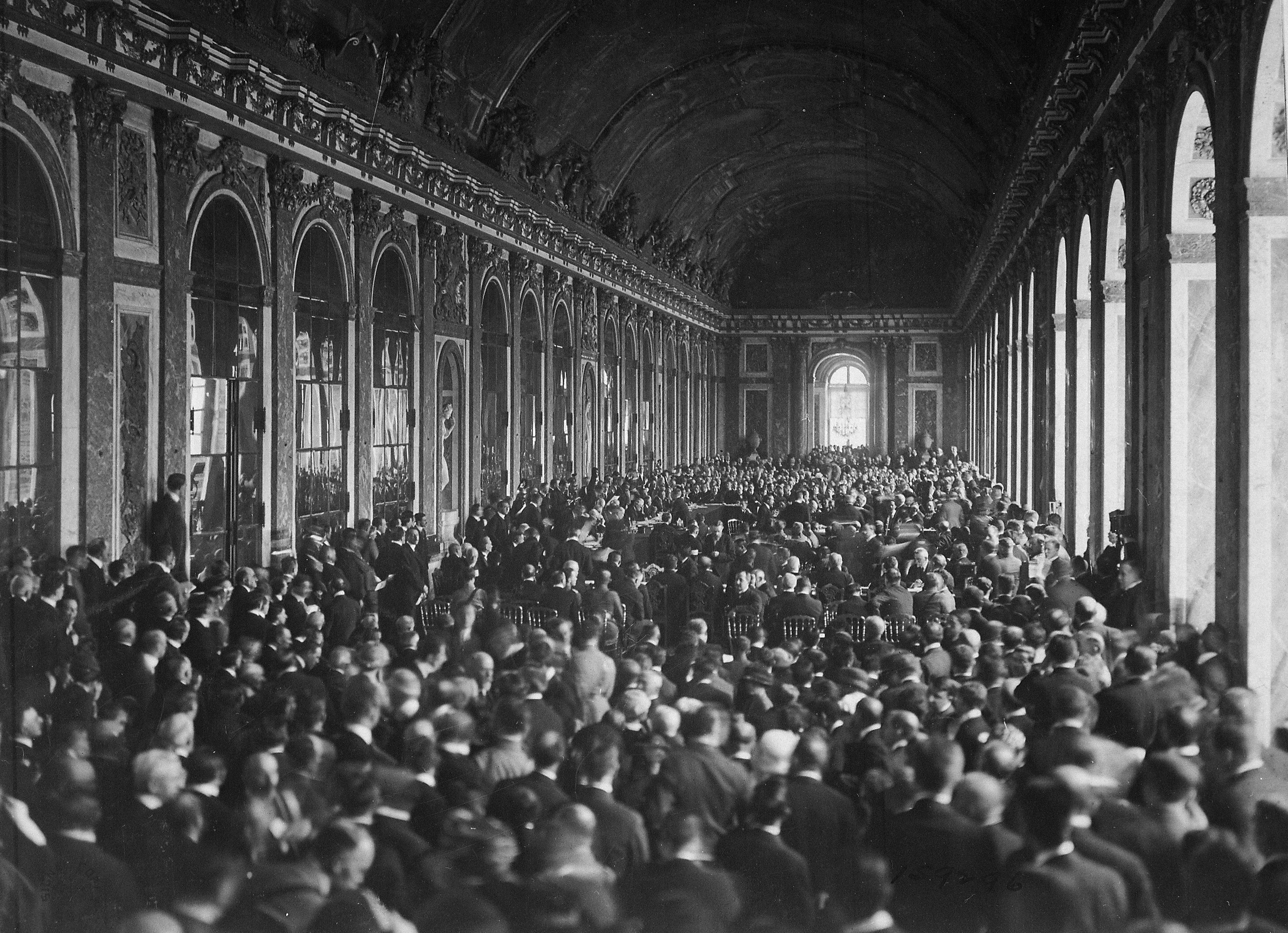
Signing of the Treaty of Versailles in the Hall of Mirrors in 1919

By losing World War I and being held responsible, "for having caused it, for all the losses and damage suffered by the Allied and Associated Governments and their nationals as a consequence of the war imposed on them by the aggression of Germany and its Allies", Germany had to confront the question of responsibility for the outbreak of the conflict. It used every means at its disposal to seek a revision of the Treaty of Versailles. On February 6, 1919, a second parliamentary commission was convened to examine its grievances. The opportunity to confront the failed peace negotiations arose when a controversy arose over the publication by Matthias Erzberger of a memoir written by Czernin, in which the latter spoke of Austria-Hungary's catastrophic military situation. Following this publication, the Triple Entente was said to have put an end to possible peace negotiations, to which Erzberger retorted that many peace attempts had failed because of the supreme command of the army and its political supporters. The various negotiations were examined, starting with Wilson's proposal of December 18, 1916. The resistance of the army was singled out as one of the reasons for the failure of the peace, and numerous political figures in office at the time were interviewed, including Chancellor Bethmann Hollweg and Generals Hindenburg and Ludendorff. The heated debates soon turned polemical, and the blame was placed squarely on the representatives of the Weimar Republic.

The parliamentary commission also examined Pope Benedict XV's appeal for peace, while being warned by the Vatican ambassador to remain discreet about the Pope's action, or risk the withdrawal of the Holy See from future diplomatic actions on Germany's behalf. In order to avoid a confrontation, as in the case of the examination of Wilson's proposal, the witnesses were politicians or military men of lower rank than the generals. The commission considered the pontifical action unsafe, reinforced by the Allies' weak willingness to conduct peace negotiations, even though some deputies such as Karl Helfferich believed that the peace action had been undermined by the Reichstag peace resolution of July 1917. After examining the Pope's action, the commission set about analyzing the so-called Briand-Lancken affair, the failure of which, according to Lancken, fell to France. Here again, caution was the order of the day. Disavowing Briand's action would lead to a hardening of Raymond Poincaré's policy, which, for Germany, would have unwelcome economic and political consequences. The Sixtus Affair was blamed for the collapse of the negotiations. In 1923, Germany was still examining its responsibility for the failure of the peace attempts. With regard to the period preceding the signing of the treaty of Brest-Litovsk, the commission noted a genuine German desire to sign a separate peace, a desire that Russia did not share. General von Haeften was also criticized for keeping quiet about his talks with the Americans in the spring of 1918, but was quickly excused despite the protests of some, such as the historian Hans Delbrück.

== See also ==
- Peace efforts during World War II
- Diplomatic history of World War I
- Sacred Union
- Woman's Peace Party
