= 65th Indiana Infantry Regiment =

65th Regiment Indiana Infantry
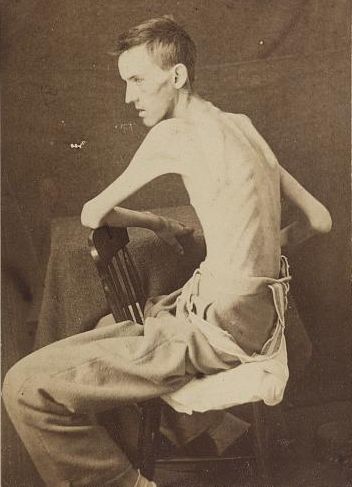
- Private Jackson O. Broshears of Company D, 65th Indiana Infantry, under medical treatment in 1864, eight weeks after his release from a Confederate prison.
- Active: August 18, 1862, to June 22, 1865
- Country: United States
- Allegiance: Union
- Branch: Army
- Type: Infantry
- Campaigns: Knoxville Campaign; Atlanta campaign Nashville Campaign; Carolinas campaign

The 65th Regiment Indiana Infantry, was organized in Princeton and recruited throughout the southern Indiana counties to fight in the American Civil War.

== Organization ==
=== Regimental commanders ===
Name	Date of Commission	Notes
John W. Foster	August 18, 1862	Resigned March 10, 1864, due to disability. Re-entered service as colonel of the 136th Regiment
Thomas Johnson	March 11, 1864	Honorably discharged as lieutenant colonel on August 29, 1864, due to disability.
John W. Hammond	September 7, 1864	Mustered out with regiment as lieutenant colonel.

=== Regimental units ===
- Company A - Men primarily recruited from Gibson and Posey counties
- Company B - Men primarily recruited from Gibson County
- Company C - Men primarily recruited from Knox County
- Company D - Men primarily recruited from Spencer County
- Company E - Men primarily recruited from Warrick County
- Company F - Men primarily recruited from Martin County
- Company G - Men primarily recruited from Gibson, Pike and Posey counties
- Company H - Men primarily recruited from Vanderburgh and Warrick counties
- Company I - Men primarily recruited from Daviess County
- Company K - Men primarily recruited from Dubois County

=== Command structure ===
Time period	Command
February 1862 to June 1863	District of Western Kentucky, Department of the Ohio
June 1863 to August 1863	1st Brigade, 2nd Division, XXIII Corps, Army of the Ohio
August 1863 to October 1863	2nd Brigade, 4th Division, XXIII Corps, Army of the Ohio
October 1863 to November 1863	4th Brigade, 4th Division, XXIII Corps, Army of the Ohio
November 1863 to April 1864	2nd Brigade, 2nd Cavalry Division, Department of the Ohio
April 1864 to February 1865	2nd Brigade, 3rd Division, XXIII Corps, Army of the Ohio
February 1865 to June 1865	Department of North Carolina

== Service ==
Date	Event
August 20, 1862	Left State for Henderson, Kentucky
August 25, 1862	Action at Madisonville, Kentucky
Through August, 1863	Guard duty along line of Louisville & Nashville Railroad
September 12, 1862	Skirmish at Bradenburg, Kentucky
September 14, 1862	Skirmish at Henderson, Kentucky (Company D)
April 1863	Regiment mounted
July 21, 1863	Action at Cheshire, Ohio
July 29, 1863	Dixon (Company E)
August 16-October 17, 1863	Burnside's Campaign in East Tennessee
September 2, 1863	Occupation of Knoxville
September 11, 1863	Action at Greenville
September 18, 1863	Kingsport
September 19, 1863	Bristol
September 20–21, 1863	Zollicoffer
September 20–21, 1863	Carter's Depot
September 21, 1863	Jonesborough
September 22, 1863	Hall's Ford, Watauga River
September 22, 1863	Carter's Depot
October 10, 1863	Blue Springs
October 11, 1863	Henderson's Mill and Rheatown
October 14, 1863	Blountsville
October 15, 1863	Bristol
November 4-December 23, 1863	Knoxville Campaign
November 19, 1863	Mulberry Gap
December 2, 1863	Walker's Ford, Clinch River
December 12, 1863	Near Maynardsville
December 14, 1863	Bean's Station
December 16–19, 1863	Blain's Cross Roads
January 16, 1864	Kimbrough's Cross Roads
January 16–17 and January 26–28, 1864	Operations about Dandridge
January 17, 1864	Dandridge
March 12, 1864	Scout to Chucky Bend
April 21, 1864	Regiment dismounted
May 1-September 8, 1864	Atlanta campaign
May 8–13, 1864	Demonstrations on Rocky Faced Ridge and Dalton
May 14–15, 1864	Battle of Resaca
May 20, 1864	Cartersville
May 25-June 5, 1864	Operations on line of Pumpkin Vine Creek and battles about Dallas, New Hope Church and Allatoona Hills
June 10-July 2, 1864	Operations about Marietta and against Kenesaw Mountain
June 15–17, 1864	Lost Mountain
June 17, 1864	Muddy Creek
June 22, 1864	Cheyney's Farm
June 26–27, 1864	Olley's Farm
June 27, 1864	Assault on Kenesaw
July 2–5, 1864	Nickajack Creek
July 5–17, 1864	Chattahoochie River
July 8, 1864	Isham's Ford
July 22-August 25, 1864	Siege of Atlanta
August 5–7, 1864	Utoy Creek
August 25–30, 1864	Flank movement on Jonesboro
August 31, 1864	Near Rough and Ready
September 2–6, 1864	Lovejoy's Station
September 28, 1864	Decatur
October 3–26, 1864	Pursuit of Hood into Alabama
November–December, 1864	Nashville Campaign
November 24–27, 1864	Columbia, Duck River
November 30, 1864	Battle of Franklin
December 15–16, 1864	Battle of Nashville
December 17–28, 1864	Pursuit of Hood to the Tennessee River
Through January 16, 1865	At Clifton, Tennessee
January 16-February 9, 1865	Movement to Washington, D. C., thence to Fort Fisher, North Carolina
February 11–14, 1865	Operations against Hoke
February 11, 1865	Sugar Leaf Battery
February 18–19, 1865	Fort Anderson
February 19–20, 1865	Town Creek
February 22, 1865	Battle of Wilmington and capture of the city
March 1-April 26, 1865	Campaign of the Carolinas
March 6–21, 1865	Advance on Goldsboro
April 10–14, 1865	Advance on Raleigh
April 14, 1865	Occupation of Raleigh
April 26, 1865	Bennett's House
	Surrender of Johnston and his army
Through June, 1865	Duty at Raleigh and Greensboro
June 22, 1865	Mustered out

=== Strength ===
Original recruitment strength was 942 with 228 additional troops; total, 1,170. Regiment lost during service 34 Enlisted men killed and mortally wounded and 4 Officers and 216 Enlisted men by disease. Total 254, Additionally, 59 desertions and 8 unaccounted.

== See also ==
- List of Indiana Civil War regiments
