= Peace efforts during World War II =

During World War II, there were several peace overtures and diplomatic efforts aimed at ending the conflict or reaching a settlement, though most were unsuccessful due to the uncompromising positions of the major belligerents.

Winston Churchill steadfastly refused to consider any form of settlement. He believed that Adolf Hitler could not be trusted and that any agreement with Germany would only lead to further destruction down the line. Churchill argued that negotiating would mean accepting German domination of Europe, which he saw as morally and strategically unacceptable. He famously declared in his "We shall fight on the beaches" speech that Britain would fight on, no matter the cost.

== Lord Halifax ==
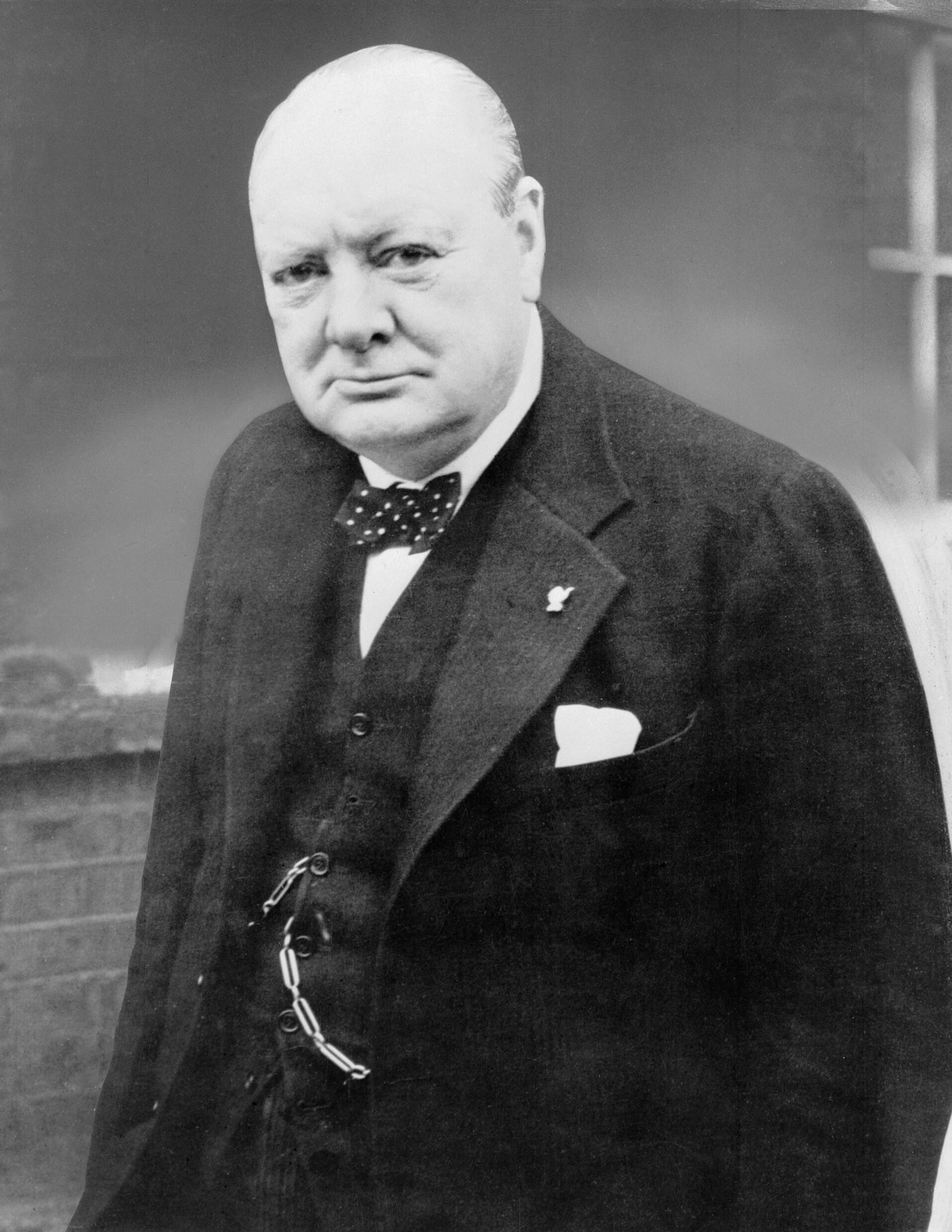
Churchill was strongly opposed to any peace settlement that meant Germany retaining its conquests.

In May 1940, after the fall of France, some members of the British government, including Lord Halifax, the foreign secretary, considered making peace with Germany. Halifax believed that Britain might not be able to continue the fight after the rapid German victories in Western Europe and thought negotiating might preserve the British Empire. During a war cabinet meeting on 26 May 1940, Halifax proposed that Mussolini act as a mediator in negotiations with Germany.

However, Winston Churchill, who had just become prime minister, strongly opposed any such negotiations, believing that Hitler could not be trusted, and that surrender or settlement would only lead to destruction down the line. Churchill argued that negotiating would mean accepting German domination of Europe, which he saw as morally and strategically unacceptable. He famously declared in his "We shall fight on the beaches" speech that Britain would fight on, no matter the cost. Churchill's firm stance ultimately prevailed, and Britain continued to fight.

== Rudolf Hess's mission ==
One of the most unusual peace overtures came in May 1941, when Rudolf Hess, a high-ranking official and Hitler's deputy, flew solo to Scotland. Hess intended to meet with British officials to broker peace between Britain and Germany. He believed that Britain, under Churchill, might still be willing to make peace if it could keep its empire, and he hoped to open a channel for negotiations. However, Hess's mission was unsanctioned by Hitler, and it was viewed with suspicion by the British government. Churchill had Hess arrested, and no formal negotiations resulted from the mission. Hess spent the remainder of the war in British custody and was later tried at Nuremberg.

== Soviet-Japanese peace negotiations ==
The Soviet Union and Japan maintained an uneasy neutrality throughout most of the war, governed by the Soviet–Japanese Neutrality Pact of 1941. However, Japan made several overtures to the Soviet Union, hoping to broker peace with the Allies through Soviet mediation. In 1945, Japan sought Soviet assistance in negotiating a settlement with the Western Allies. The Soviet Union, however, had its own agenda. Stalin delayed action on Japan's overtures because he had already agreed at the Yalta Conference (February 1945) to enter the war against Japan after defeating Germany. When the Soviets declared war on Japan in August 1945, these negotiations became irrelevant.

== Italian attempts at peace ==
By 1943, the situation in Italy had become desperate. The Allied invasion of Sicily and growing discontent within Italy forced Benito Mussolini's government to consider peace. In July 1943, King Victor Emmanuel III had Mussolini arrested, and Marshal Pietro Badoglio took over as prime minister. Secret negotiations were soon opened between the Italian government and the Allies. These negotiations culminated in the Armistice of Cassibile, signed on 3 September 1943, which effectively took Italy out of the war. However, it was kept secret until 8 September, when it was announced by the Allies. The Germans quickly moved to occupy northern Italy, and a brutal civil war ensued between Italian fascists (supported by Germany) and anti-fascist partisans (supported by the Allies).

== Swedish and Vatican diplomacy ==
During the later years of the war, neutral countries like Sweden and the Vatican sought to act as intermediaries to broker peace, especially as the tide of war turned decisively against Germany. Swedish officials, including Count Folke Bernadotte, conducted backchannel discussions with German officials in 1944, particularly Himmler, who was exploring possible ways to negotiate with the Western Allies as Germany's defeat loomed.

The Vatican, under Pope Pius XII, also attempted to mediate peace, primarily between the Axis powers and the Allies. However, these efforts were unsuccessful due to the Allies' commitment to unconditional surrender and the German leadership’s reluctance to give up power.

== German resistance peace feelers ==
Some members of the German resistance, including high-ranking military officers and civilians opposed to Hitler’s regime, attempted to negotiate with the Allies. The most significant attempt came in 1944, following the failed 20 July plot to assassinate Hitler. Figures within the German military and civilian resistance, such as Colonel Claus von Stauffenberg and other conspirators, hoped to remove Hitler and negotiate peace, particularly with the Western Allies. However, these resistance groups were never able to gain enough power to oust Hitler, and their efforts at negotiation were stymied by the Allies' demand for unconditional surrender. After the failed assassination attempt, the Gestapo cracked down on the resistance, and the opportunity for peace through internal resistance effectively ended.

== The Himmler peace overture ==
In the final months of the war, Heinrich Himmler, one of Hitler's closest associates and head of the SS, made secret overtures to the Western Allies in an attempt to negotiate a peace settlement. Himmler hoped to save himself and perhaps create a division between the Western Allies and the Soviet Union. These overtures were made through Swedish intermediaries, including Count Bernadotte, but were flatly rejected by the Allies. When Hitler learned of Himmler's unauthorized attempt to negotiate peace, he was furious and ordered his arrest. Himmler went into hiding and eventually committed suicide after being captured by the Allies in May 1945.

== See also ==
- Peace efforts during World War I
