= Eleanor Lansing Dulles =

American government official (1895–1996)

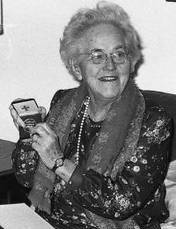
- Born: June 1, 1895; Watertown, New York, U.S.
- Died: October 30, 1996 (aged 101); Washington, D.C., U.S.
- Resting place: Rock Creek Cemetery; Washington, D.C., U.S.
- Education: Bryn Mawr College (BA); Radcliffe College (MA); Harvard University (PhD)
- Occupations: Academic; economist; professor
- Known for: Academia; diplomacy; publishing
- Spouse: David Simon Blondheim (m. 1932; died 1934)
- Children: 2
- Relatives: John Watson Foster (grandfather); Mary Parke Foster (grandmother); Robert Lansing (uncle); John Foster Dulles (brother); Allen Dulles (brother); Avery Cardinal Dulles (nephew)

Eleanor Lansing Dulles (June 1, 1895 – October 30, 1996) was an American writer, professor, and United States government employee. Her background in economics and her familiarity with European affairs enabled her to fill a number of important State Department positions.

== Early life and college ==
Eleanor Lansing Dulles was born on June 1, 1895, in Watertown, New York, one of five siblings born to Allen Macy Dulles and Edith (née Foster) Dulles. Her grandfather, John Watson Foster, served as United States Secretary of State under President Benjamin Harrison, for eight months. Her mother's sister married Robert Lansing, Secretary of State under President Woodrow Wilson.

Her eldest brother, John Foster Dulles, was Secretary of State under President Dwight D. Eisenhower. Her other brother, Allen Dulles, served as Director of the Central Intelligence Agency from 1953 to 1961. She had two sisters, as well, Margaret and Nataline. Her nephew Avery Dulles was a prominent lay Catholic convert, who was made a cardinal of the Roman Catholic Church.

Dulles attended Wykeham Rise School in Washington, Connecticut, and attended Bryn Mawr College, graduating with a B.A. in 1917.

== Early career ==
After graduating from college, Dulles spent two years working for relief organizations in France. When World War I ended, she continued her schooling. Still convinced European studies were useful to her, in 1921–22 she took courses at the Sorbonne. She returned to the U.S. for a radical change of pace, taking odd jobs in the real world including running a punch press at the American Tube and Stamping Company in Bridgeport, Connecticut, and working as a payroll clerk for a hair-net company in Long Island City, Queens, New York.

Beginning in 1923, she studied at Radcliffe College and Harvard University, earning her M.A. from the former in 1924 and a doctorate in economics from the latter in 1926, writing her thesis on the French franc. She taught economics at Simmons College during the 1924–1925 academic year. For the next ten years she taught economics at various colleges, including Simmons, Bryn Mawr, and the University of Pennsylvania. As a student and college professor she made frequent trips to Europe to study and conduct research on European financial matters. Though she married in 1932, she always used her maiden name professionally.

In 1933, she argued against the supposed benefits of inflationary government policies in The Dollar, the Franc and Inflation.

In 1936, Dulles entered government service. Her first position was at the Social Security Board, where she studied the economic aspects of financing the Social Security program. In April 1942, she transferred to the Board of Economic Warfare where she spent five months studying various types of international economic matters.

== State Department ==
In September 1942, she joined the Department of State, where she worked, aside from a short stint at the Department of Commerce, for almost twenty years, beginning as an Economic Officer in the Division of Postwar Planning.

During her first three years at the State Department, Dulles was involved in post-war economic planning. She helped determine the U.S. position on international financial cooperation and participated in the Bretton Woods Conference of 1944 at which the International Monetary Fund and the International Bank for Reconstruction and Development were established. After the end of World War II, in the spring of 1945 she went to Europe, where she became involved in the reconstruction of the Austrian economy as the U.S. Financial Attaché in Austria.

In 1949, Eleanor transferred to the German Austrian Division at the State Department, where she took an active interest in the affairs of Berlin and became a member of the informal 'Berlin Lobby' in the United States.

She worked for the Commerce Department for several months in 1951–1952, and then returned to the State Department Office of German Affairs shortly before her brother John Foster Dulles became Secretary of State. She successfully resisted his attempts to remove her from her position.

She made many trips to Berlin and was involved in planning the construction of the Berlin Medical Center. The Berlin Congress Hall, the U.S. contribution to the International Building Exhibition was nicknamed the Dulleseum (Dulles plus Museum) for the role of Eleanor and her brother John Foster in its financing and construction. Later, she was hailed as "the Mother of Berlin" for helping to revitalize Berlin's economy and culture during the 1950s.

In 1958, she described the working environment at the State Department:

This place is a real man's world if ever there was one. It's riddled with prejudices. If you are a woman in Government service you just have to work 10 times as hard–and even then it takes much skill to paddle around the various taboos. But it is fun to see how far you can get in spite of being a woman.

In 1959, Dulles transferred from the German Desk to the Bureau of Intelligence and Research, where she became involved in a study of economic conditions in underdeveloped countries. As part of the study she traveled extensively in Africa, Latin America and South Asia.

Secretary of State Dean Rusk requested her resignation on September 21, 1961, at the insistence of the Kennedy Administration following the April Bay of Pigs Invasion, a foreign relations disaster for the U.S. that her brother Allen had overseen as head of the CIA. She resigned in January 1962.

== Academia and publishing ==
She returned to teaching, first at Duke University and then at Georgetown University.

She authored several books on U.S. foreign policy. In 1963 she published a study of her brother's final year at the State Department, John Foster Dulles: The Last Year, with a foreword by President Eisenhower.

She continued her trips abroad, sometimes as a representative of the U.S. Government. In 1967, she represented the United States at the funeral of Konrad Adenauer. She also wrote several books describing conditions in Germany.

In 1978, she criticized Leonard Mosley's biography of her and her brothers, Dulles. She had given the author several interviews, but said his "implication that three people could connive to produce a foreign policy is a schoolboy approach". She said it contain 900 errors, twice as many as Townsend Hoopes' hostile study The Devil and John Foster Dulles.

She wrote a study of Dean Acheson and John Foster Dulles that found commonality in their approaches to deterrence. It remained unpublished at her death.

== Awards ==
Radcliffe gave her its Distinguished Achievement Award in 1955. In 1957 the Free University of Berlin gave her an honorary doctorate and she received the Carl Schurz Plaque.

In 1993, Dulles donated a collection of her documents to the Mount Vernon College for Women, which merged with the George Washington University in 1999. The collection contains a variety of materials that document both her professional and personal life. It is currently cared for by GWU's Special Collections Research Center, located in the Estelle and Melvin Gelman Library.

== Personal life ==
Dulles married David Simon Blondheim (1884–1934) on December 6, 1932. Blondheim had been a Medieval Studies fellow of the John Simon Guggenheim Memorial Foundation in 1926 and then a professor at Johns Hopkins University from 1929 to 1932. He was Romance philologist with a specialty in Judeo-Romance, a field that in many ways he invented. Blondheim committed suicide on March 19, 1934.

Dulles and Blondheim had a son, David Dulles (born 1934, after his father's death). She later adopted a daughter, Ann Welsh Dulles (1937–2006), who was known after her 1962 marriage as Ann Dulles Joor.

Dulles died on October 30, 1996, aged 101, in a retirement home in Washington, D.C., and was buried in Rock Creek Cemetery there.

=== Henderson Harbor ===
Throughout her life, Dulles spent summers in Henderson Harbor, New York. She was first introduced to the area as a child through her maternal grandparents who maintained a cottage there. Dulles maintained a summer residence there as an adult and in 1963 publicly campaigned against the construction of large cement plant that would endanger the ecological beauty and serenity of the area.

== Ancestry ==
Ancestors of Eleanor Lansing Dulles

16.Joseph Dulles
8.Joseph Heatly Dulles
17. Sophie Heatly
4.John Welsh Dulles
18.John Welsh
9.Margaret Welsh
19.Jemima Maris
2.Allen Macy Dulles
20.Miron Winslow, jr
10.Miron Winslow
21.Joanna Kellogg
5.Harriet Winslow
22.Charles Lathrop
11.Harriet Wadsworth Lathrop
23.Joanna Leffingwell
1.Eleanor Lansing Dulles
24.George Forster
12.Matthew Watson Foster
25.Jane Watson
6.John Watson Foster
26.John Johnson
13. Eleanor Johnson
3.Edith Foster
14.Alexander McFerson
7.Mary Parke McFerson
30.Ezra Read
15.Eliza Read
31.Nancy Clark

== Writings ==
Author

- The French Franc 1914–1928: The Facts and Their Interpretation (1928, reprinted 1978 by Arno Press)
- The Bank for International Settlements at Work (NY: Macmillan Co., 1932)
- The Dollar, the Franc and Inflation (NY: Macmillan Co., 1933)
- Depression and Reconstruction (University of Pennsylvania Press, 1936)
- Financing the Social Security Act: A report made for the Bureau of Research and Statistics of the Social Security Board (Washington, D.C.: Bureau of Research and Statistics of the Social Security Board, 1937)
- John Foster Dulles: The Last Year (NY: Harcourt, Brace & World, 1963)
- Berlin–The Wall Is Not Forever (University of North Carolina Press, 1967)
- American Foreign Policy in the Making (NY: Harper & Row, 1968)
- One Germany or Two (Hoover Institution Press, Stanford University, 1970)
- The Wall: A Tragedy in Three Acts (University of South Carolina Press, 1972)
- Eleanor Lansing Dulles: Chances of a Lifetime, a Memoir (Prentice-Hall, 1980)

Co-author

- Détente: Cold War Strategies in Transition (1965), with Richard Crane Dickson
- Dominican Action–1965: Intervention or Cooperation? (1966), with Willard L. Beaulac, Karl H. Cerny, Jules Davids, and Joseph S. Farland
