= David S. Blondheim =

David Simon Blondheim (August 25, 1884 – March 19, 1934) was a professor of Romance philology at the Johns Hopkins University and a scholar of medieval Jewish texts in Romance languages.

== Education ==
Blondheim received an A.B. in 1906 and a Ph.D. in 1910 from the Johns Hopkins University, with study in Paris at the École des Hautes Études. He was Associate Professor of Romance Languages at the University of Illinois (Urbana-Champaign) when, in 1917, he was appointed to the faculty at the Johns Hopkins University.

== Career ==
Blondheim was a major figure in the study of Jewish varieties of medieval Romance languages and researched Jewish medieval writings, particularly Hebraico-French texts, and was the author of many books about early translations of Jewish texts. He carried on the research of Arsene Darmesteter into rabbinical glosses. He was also an important scholarly editor.

A substantial survey of Blondheim's life and work appeared as David L. Gold, 'Towards a Prosopography of David Simon Blondheim (1884-1934),' Jewish Language Review (Haifa, Israel: Association for the Study of Jewish Languages), vol. 6 (1986), 185–202. An extensive bibliography was published elsewhere.

"Blondheim's papers are in the National and University Library, Jerusalem" (Gold, op. cit., p. 202), as well as at the George Washington University in Washington, D.C.

== Personal life ==
He was married twice. He and his first wife had a son (Hillel Blondheim); they later divorced. He then married Eleanor Lansing Dulles in December 1932. Their son (David Dulles) was born after his father's suicide.

== Publications ==
- D. S. Blondheim, Contribution à la lexicographie française d’après des sources rabbiniques (Paris: Champion, 1910). (Ph.D. thesis, The Johns Hopkins University.)
- David Simon Blondheim, A Brilliant and Eccentric Mathematician, The Johns Hopkins Alumni Magazine 9.2 (Jan. 1921), pp. 119–140. General Books, 978-1-235-59885-2 [A biographical article about James Joseph Sylvester.] See also D. S. Blondheim, 'James Joseph Sylvester,' Jewish Comment (Baltimore) May 25, 1906.
- Kadimah, a publication of the Intercollegiate Zionist Association of America, David S. Blondheim, ed. (New York: Federation of American Zionists, 1918).
- D. S. Blondheim, Louis Hiram Levin: Zionist Statesman, Jewish Times (Baltimore), June 29, 1923.
- D. S. Blondheim, Les parlers judéo-romans et la Vetus Latina: étude sur les rapports entre les traductions bibliques en langue romane des Juifs au moyen âge et les anciennes versions (Paris: Champion, 1925).
- D. S. Blondheim, "Essai d’un vocabulaire comparatif des parlers judéo-romans." In D. S. Blondheim, Les parlers judéo-romans et la Vetus Latina: étude sur les rapports entre les traductions bibliques en langue romane des Juifs au moyen âge et les anciennes versions (Paris: Champion, 1925).
- D. S. Blondheim, Poèmes judéo-français du moyen-âge, publiés et étudiés par D. S. Blondheim (Paris: Champion, 1927).
- A. Darmesteter et D. S. Blondheim, Les gloses françaises dans les Commentaires talmudiques de Raschi, 2 vols. (Paris: Champion, 1929–1937).
- D. S. Blondheim, Liste des manuscrits des Commentaires bibliques de Raschi, Revue des études juives 91 (1931), 71 et seq. and 155 et seq.
- David Simon Blondheim, Notes on the Italian Words in the Aruch Completum (New York: Alexander Kohut Memorial Foundation, 1933).
- Unfinished and apparently unpublished: D. S. Blondheim, "a study of Raschi's Biblical glosses." (Reported in Gold, op. cit., p. 191.)
