= Thomas H. Nelson =

American lawyer and diplomat (1821–1896)

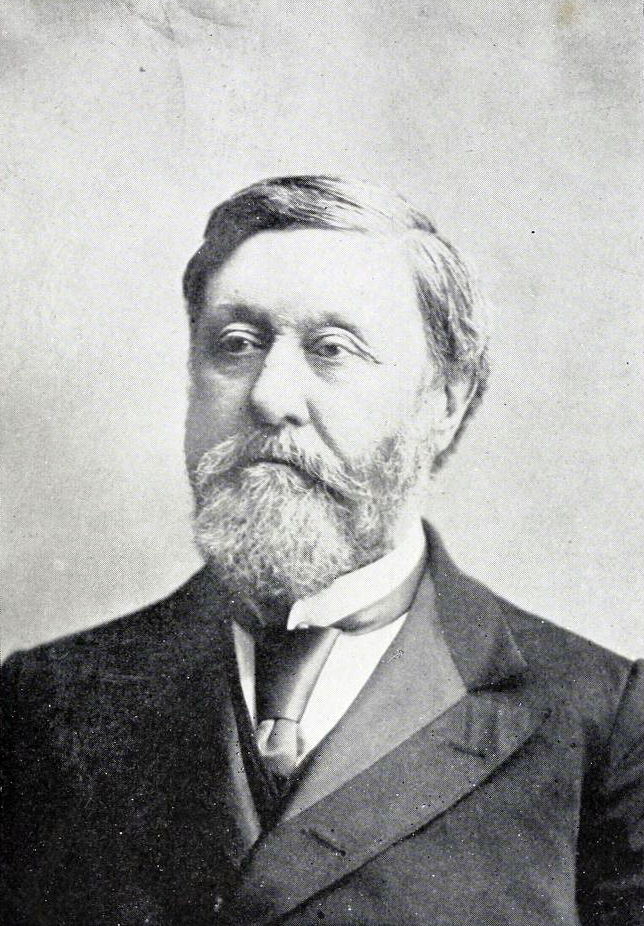
Hon. Thomas H. Nelson, circa 1894.

Thomas Henry Nelson (October 24, 1821 – March 14, 1896) was a U.S. diplomat and politician from Indiana.

== Early life ==
Nelson was born on October 24, 1821, in Mason County, Kentucky, to Dr. Thomas W. Nelson and Frances Doniphan Nelson.

On Dec 11, 1843, in Aberdeen, Ohio, Nelson married Elizabeth "Lizzie" Key, the daughter of Marshall Key and Harriet Sellman Key. She was a student of Harriet Beecher Stowe.

The Nelsons moved to Rockville, Indiana, where he set up a law practice. A few years later, the couple moved to Terre Haute, Indiana. In 1852 he was on the Board of Commissioners for the construction of the Springfield and Terre Haute Railroad.

== Career ==
During the late 1850s, he was a leader of the Whig Party and he was tasked with organizing the Republican Party in Indiana.

In 1860, he unsuccessfully ran for the United States Congress.

He was appointed envoy extraordinary and minister plenipotentiary to Chile in 1861 to 1866 by U.S. president Abraham Lincoln. On December 8, 1863, he organized rescue operations during the catastrophic Church of the Company Fire in Santiago and was commended for his act of bravery.

He was appointed minister to Mexico from 1869 by Ulysses S. Grant, but resigned in 1873.

Nelson died in Terre Haute, on March 14, 1896, and is buried at its Woodlawn Cemetery.

== Notes ==
Diplomatic posts
Preceded by John Bigler	United States Envoy to Chile; 4 October 1861 – 12 March 1866	Succeeded by Hugh Judson Kilpatrick
Preceded by William S. Rosecrans	United States Envoy to Mexico; June 26, 1869 – June 16, 1873	Succeeded by John W. Foster
