= 136th Indiana Infantry Regiment =

- Active: May 21 – September 2, 1864
- Disbanded: September 2, 1864
- Country: United States
- Allegiance: Union
- Branch: Infantry
- Size: Regiment
- Engagements: American Civil War

The 136th Indiana Infantry Regiment served in the Union Army between May 21 and September 2, 1864, during the American Civil War.

== Service ==
The regiment was organized at Indianapolis, Indiana and mustered in on May 21, 1864. It was ordered to Tennessee and Alabama for railroad guard duty, until early September 1864. The regiment was mustered out on September 2, 1864. During its service the regiment lost eight men to disease.

== See also ==
- List of Indiana Civil War regiments

== Bibliography ==
- Dyer, Frederick H. (1959). A Compendium of the War of the Rebellion. New York and London. Thomas Yoseloff, Publisher. LCCN 59-12963.
