= SS Robert Lansing =

Liberty ship of WWII

History

United States
- Name: Robert Lansing
- Namesake: Robert Lansing
- Owner: War Shipping Administration (WSA)
- Operator: Moore-McCormack Lines, Inc.
- Ordered: as type (EC2-S-C1) hull, MC hull 1531
- Builder: J.A. Jones Construction, Panama City, Florida
- Cost: $1,533,395
- Yard number: 13
- Way number: 1
- Laid down: 3 June 1943
- Launched: 17 July 1943
- Completed: 6 August 1943
- Identification: Call Signal: KXLT
- Fate: Laid up in the National Defense Reserve Fleet, Wilmington, North Carolina, 5 June 1948; Sold for scrapping, 24 March 1967

General characteristics
- Class & type: Liberty ship; type EC2-S-C1, standard
- Tonnage: 10,865 LT DWT; 7,176 GRT
- Displacement: 3,380 long tons (3,434 t) (light); 14,245 long tons (14,474 t) (max)
- Length: 441 feet 6 inches (135 m) oa; 416 feet (127 m) pp; 427 feet (130 m) lwl
- Beam: 57 feet (17 m)
- Draft: 27 ft 9.25 in (8.4646 m)
- Installed power: 2 × Oil fired 450 °F (232 °C) boilers, operating at 220 psi (1,500 kPa); 2,500 hp (1,900 kW)
- Propulsion: 1 × triple-expansion steam engine, (manufactured by Filer and Stowell, Milwaukee, Wisconsin); 1 × screw propeller
- Speed: 11.5 knots (21.3 km/h; 13.2 mph)
- Capacity: 562,608 cubic feet (15,931 m^{3}) (grain); 499,573 cubic feet (14,146 m^{3}) (bale)
- Complement: 38–62 USMM; 21–40 USNAG
- Armament: Varied by ship; Bow-mounted 3-inch (76 mm)/50-caliber gun; Stern-mounted 4-inch (102 mm)/50-caliber gun; 2–8 × single 20-millimeter (0.79 in) Oerlikon anti-aircraft (AA) cannons and/or, 2–8 × 37-millimeter (1.46 in) M1 AA guns

SS Robert Lansing was a Liberty ship built in the United States during World War II. She was named after Robert Lansing, a Counselor of the United States Department of State and United States Secretary of State under Woodrow Wilson.

== Construction ==
Robert Lansing was laid down on 3 June 1943, under a United States Maritime Commission (MARCOM) contract, MC hull 1531, by J.A. Jones Construction, Panama City, Florida; she was launched on 17 July 1943.

== History ==
She was allocated to Moore-McCormack Lines, Inc., on 6 August 1943. On 5 June 1948, she was laid up in the National Defense Reserve Fleet, in Wilmington, North Carolina. On 24 March 1967, she was sold for $48,071 to Union Minerals and Alloys Corporation, for scrapping. She was removed from the fleet on 7 April 1967.

== Bibliography ==
- "Jones Construction, Panama City FL". ShipbuildingHistory.com. 13 October 2010.
- Maritime Administration. "Robert Lansing". Ship History Database Vessel Status Card. U.S. Department of Transportation, Maritime Administration.
- Davies, James (May 2004). "Specifications (As-Built)" (PDF). p. 23.
- "SS Robert Lansing".
