= Robert Lansing =

American politician and diplomat (1864–1928)

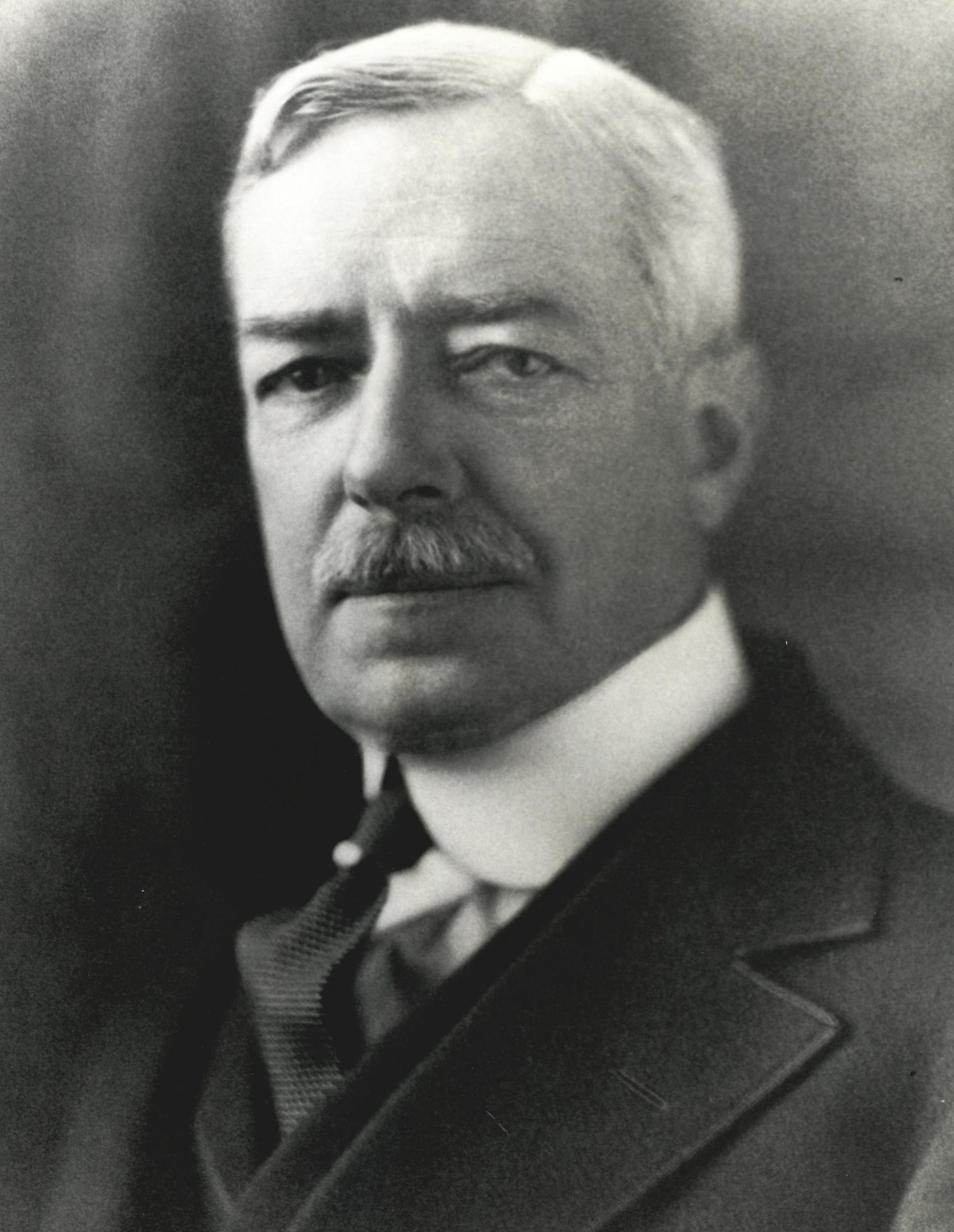

42nd United States Secretary of State
- In office June 24, 1915 – February 13, 1920; Acting: June 9 – 24, 1915
- President: Woodrow Wilson
- Preceded by: William Jennings Bryan
- Succeeded by: Bainbridge Colby

3rd Counselor of the United States Department of State
- In office April 1, 1914 – June 23, 1915
- President: Woodrow Wilson
- Preceded by: John Bassett Moore
- Succeeded by: Frank Polk

Personal details
- Born: October 17, 1864 Watertown, New York, U.S.
- Died: October 30, 1928 (aged 64) New York City, U.S.
- Party: Democratic
- Spouse: Eleanor Foster (m. 1890)
- Education: Amherst College (BA)

Robert Lansing (/ˈlænsɪŋ/; October 17, 1864 – October 30, 1928) was an American lawyer and diplomat who served as the 42nd United States Secretary of State under President Woodrow Wilson from 1915 to 1920. As Counselor to the State Department and then as Secretary of State, he was a leading advocate for American involvement in World War I.

Lansing was born and raised in Watertown, New York, where he joined his father's law firm after graduating from Amherst College. After developing expertise in international law and marrying the daughter of Secretary of State John W. Foster, he served as associate counsel to the United States delegations to the Bering Sea Arbitration and Bering Sea Claims, before arguing the United States case before the Alaska Boundary Tribunal in 1903.

As a conservative, pro-business voice in the Democratic Party, Lansing was appointed by Woodrow Wilson as Counselor to the State Department under Secretary of State William Jennings Bryan. When Bryan resigned on June 8, 1915 over Wilson's policy toward Germany, Lansing was elevated to succeed him.

As Secretary of State, Lansing was a strong advocate for the United States' role in establishing international law and an avowed critic of German autocracy and Russian Bolshevism. Before U.S. involvement in the war, Lansing vigorously advocated freedom of the seas and the rights of neutral nations. He later advocated U.S. participation in World War I, negotiated the Lansing–Ishii Agreement with Japan in 1917 and was a member of the American Commission to Negotiate Peace at Paris in 1919. However, Wilson made Colonel House his chief foreign policy advisor because Lansing privately opposed much of the Treaty of Versailles and was skeptical of the Wilsonian principle of self-determination.

== Career ==
Robert Lansing was born in Watertown, New York, the son of John Lansing (1832–1907) and Maria Lay (Dodge) Lansing. He attended Watertown High School in his home city. He graduated from Amherst College in 1886, studied law, and was admitted to the bar in 1889.

From then to 1907, he was a member of the law firm of Lansing & Lansing at Watertown. An authority on international law, he served as associate counsel for the United States, during the Bering Sea Arbitration from 1892–1893, as counsel for the United States Bering Sea Claims Commission in 1896–1897, as the government's lawyer before the Alaskan Boundary Tribunal in 1903, as counsel for the North Atlantic Fisheries in the Arbitration at The Hague in 1909–1910, and as agent of the United States in the American and British Arbitration in 1912–1914.

In 1914 Lansing was appointed counselor to the State Department by President Woodrow Wilson. Lansing, who had argued cases before Judge Nicholas D. Yost in Watertown, was responsible for encouraging the judge's son, future Ambassador Charles W. Yost, to join the Foreign Service. He was a founding member of the American Society of International Law and helped establish the American Journal of International Law.

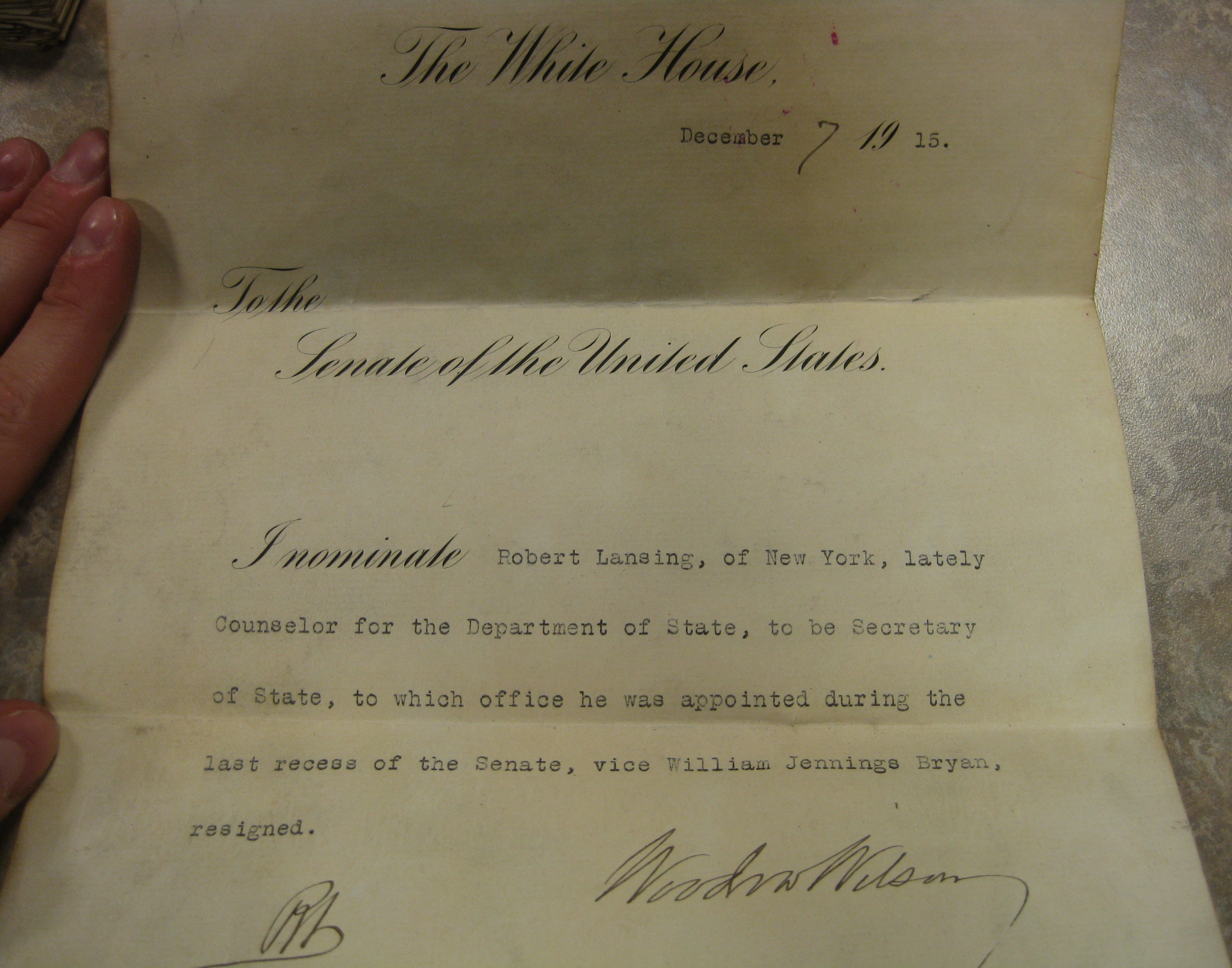
Lansing's Secretary of State nomination

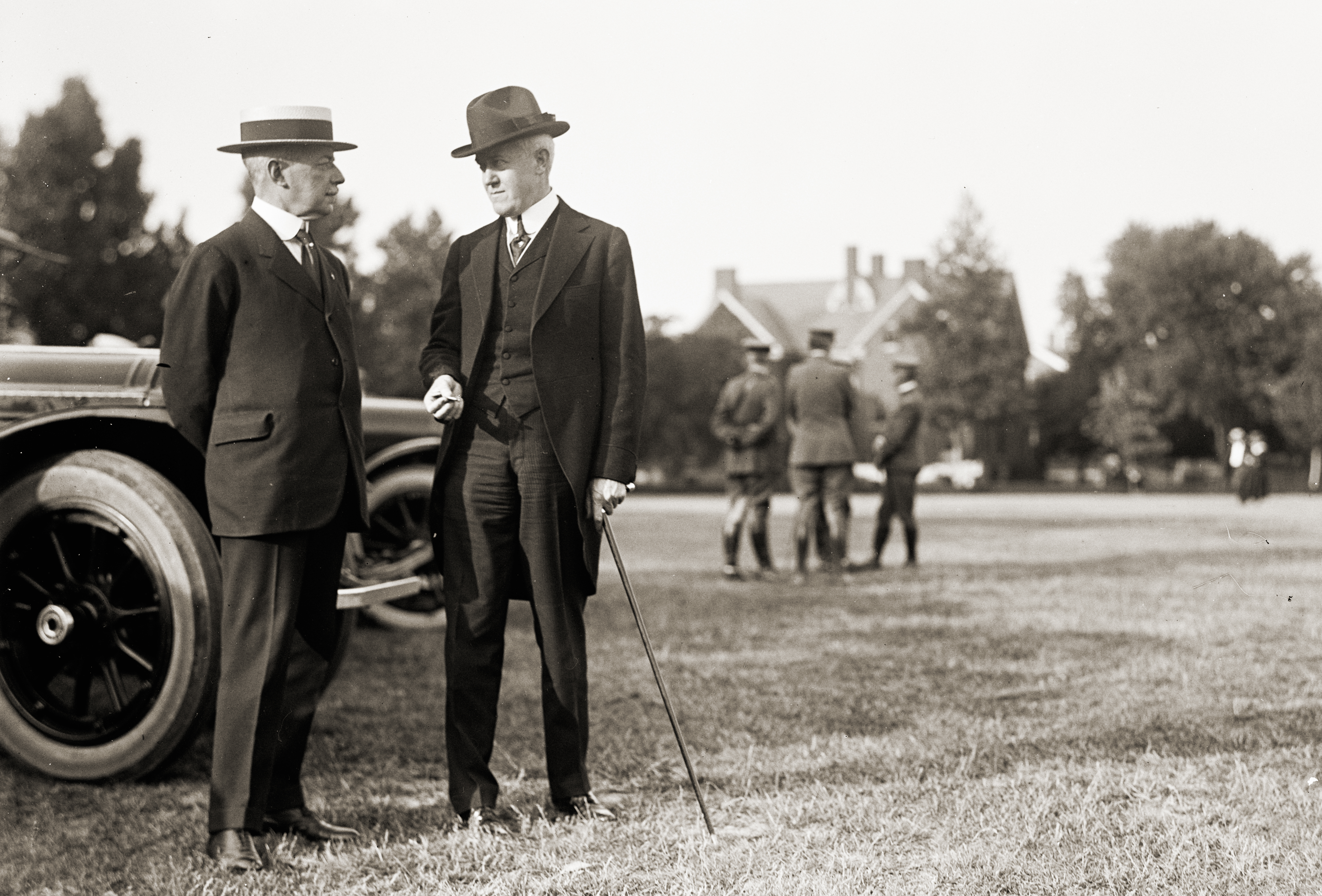
Lansing and Solicitor General of the United States John W. Davis in 1917

=== World War I ===
Lansing initially advocated for the United States to adopt a position of "benevolent neutrality" after the outbreak of World War I and opposed the blockade of Germany by the Allied powers.

Following the sinking of the RMS Lusitania on 7 May 1915 by the German submarine U-20, Lansing backed Woodrow Wilson in issuing three notes of protest to the German government. William Jennings Bryan resigned as Secretary of State following Wilson's second note, which Bryan considered too belligerent. Consulting Colonel House, Wilson was advised to select Lansing as replacement secretary because he did not have "too many ideas of his own". Unlike Bryan he lacked a political base, though he had technical knowledge of international law and diplomatic procedure. Wilson told Colonel House that as president he would practically be his own Secretary of State, and "Lansing would not be troublesome by uprooting or injecting his own views."

According to John Milton Cooper, appointing Lansing and then "treating him like a clerk" was one of Wilson's worst mistakes as president. While Wilson set foreign policy directions almost entirely on his own, Lansing resented this treatment, and attempted to undermine the president in various ways. As Lansing said in his memoirs, following the Lusitania tragedy he had the "conviction that we would ultimately become the ally of Britain".

According to Lester H. Woolsey, Lansing expressed his views by manipulating the work of the State Department to minimize conflict with Britain and maximize public awareness of Germany's faults. Woolsey states:

Although the President cherished the hope that the United States would not be drawn into the war, and while this was the belief of many officials, Mr. Lansing early in July, 1915, came to the conclusion that the German ambition for world domination was the real menace of the war, particularly to democratic institutions.

In order to block this German ambition, he believed that the progress of the war would eventually disclose to the American people the purposes of the German Government; that German activities in the United States and in Latin America should be carefully investigated and frustrated; that the American republics to the south should be weaned from the German influences; that friendly relations with Mexico should be maintained even to the extent of recognizing the Carranza faction; that the Danish West Indies should be acquired in order to remove the possibility of Germany's obtaining a foothold in the Caribbean by conquest of Denmark or otherwise; that the United States should enter the war if it should appear that Germany would become the victor; and that American public opinion must be awakened in preparation for this contingency.

This outline of Mr. Lansing's views explains why the Lusitania dispute was not brought to the point of a break. It also explains why, though Americans were incensed at the British interference with commerce, the controversy was kept within the arena of debate.

German historian Gerhard Ritter wrote of Lansing in this period: "Lansing had the coolest head among all of Wilson's advisers. His power politics were least inhibited by moral considerations and pacifist impulses."

In 1916, Lansing hired a handful of men who became the State Department's first special agents in the new Bureau of Secret Intelligence. The agents were initially used to observe the activities of the Central Powers in America and later to watch over interned German diplomats. The small group of agents hired by Lansing would eventually become the U.S. Diplomatic Security Service (DSS).

=== Later life ===
In 1919, Lansing became the nominal head of the US Commission to the Paris Peace Conference. Because he did not regard the League of Nations as essential to the peace treaty, Lansing began to fall out of favor with Wilson, who considered participation in the League of Nations to be a primary goal. During Wilson's stroke and illness, Lansing called the cabinet together for consultations on several occasions. In addition, he was the first cabinet member to suggest for Vice President Thomas R. Marshall to assume the powers of the presidency. Displeased by Lansing's independence, Edith Wilson requested Lansing's resignation. Lansing stepped down from his post on February 12, 1920.

After leaving office, Lansing resumed practicing law. He died in New York City on October 30, 1928 at the age of 64, and was buried at Brookside Cemetery in Watertown, New York.

== Personal life and family ==
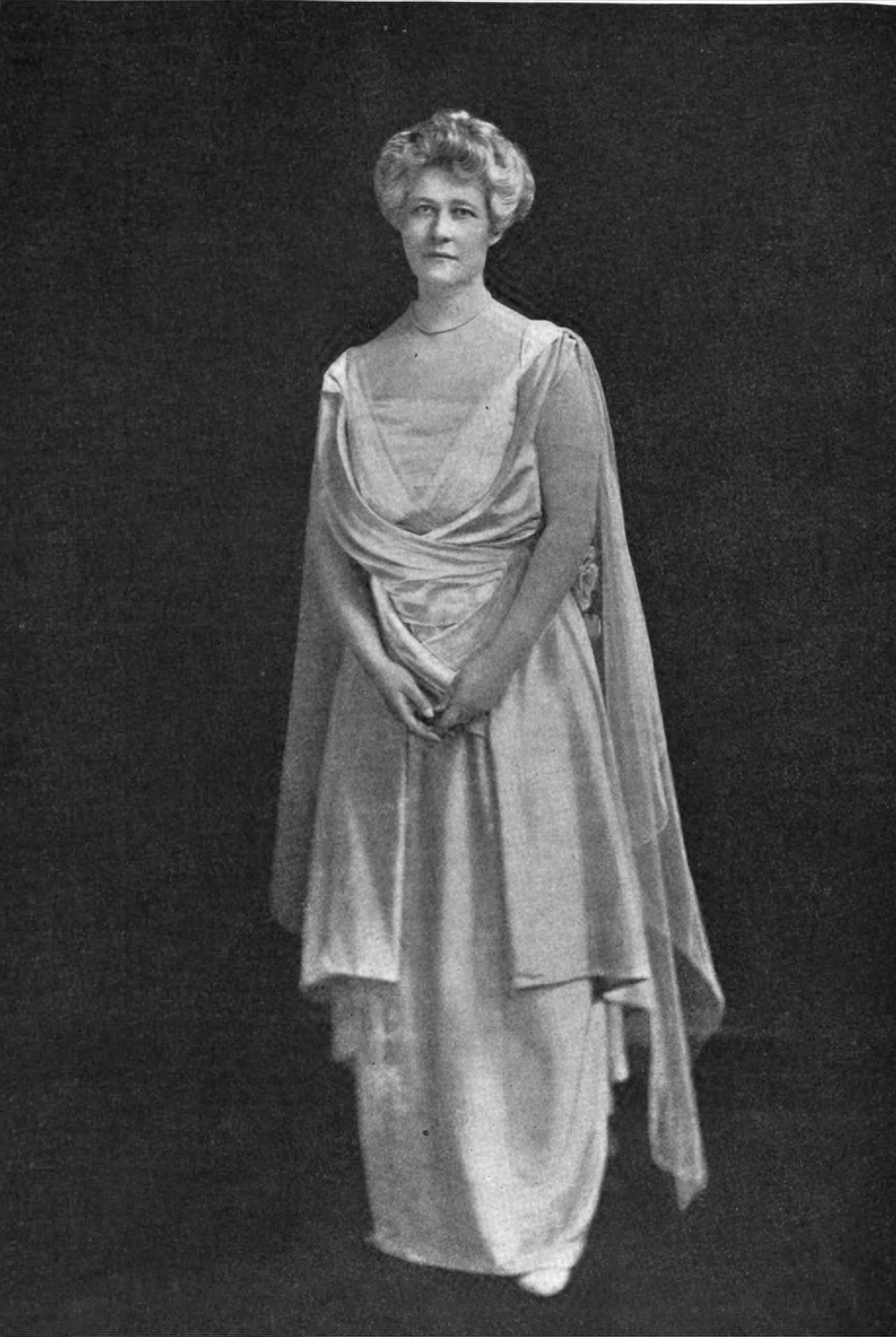
Eleanor Foster

Through his father Lansing was descended from Thomas Dudley, John Allin, Samuel Appleton and Thomas Mayhew. Through his mother he was descended from Miles Morgan, John Mason, Roger Williams, Anne Hutchinson and John Cutt. In 1890, Lansing married Eleanor Foster, the daughter of Secretary of State John W. Foster. Eleanor's older sister Edith was the mother of John Foster Dulles, who also became Secretary of State, Allen Welsh Dulles who served as Director of Central Intelligence, and Eleanor Lansing Dulles, an economist and high level policy analyst and advisor for the State Department.

New York State Senator Robert Lansing (1799–1878) was his grandfather; Chancellor John Lansing Jr. and State Treasurer Abraham G. Lansing were his great-granduncles.

== Authorship ==
Lansing was associate editor of the American Journal of International Law, and with Gary M. Jones was the author of Government: Its Origin, Growth, and Form in the United States (1902). He also wrote: The Big Four and Others at the Peace Conference, Boston (1921) and The Peace Negotiations: A Personal Narrative, Boston/New York (1921).

Lansing kept a voluminous archive of US government communications during WWI, which are a key resource on US thinking and decision making in this period.

- "Papers Relating to the Foreign Relations of the United States, The Lansing Papers, 1914–1920, Volume I". 1939.
- "Papers Relating to the Foreign Relations of the United States, The Lansing Papers, 1914–1920, Volume II". 1940.

== Legacy and honors ==
During World War II the Liberty ship SS Robert Lansing was built in Panama City, Florida, and named in his honor.

== See also ==
- Foreign policy of the Woodrow Wilson administration

Political offices
Preceded by William Jennings Bryan	U.S. Secretary of State; Served under: Woodrow Wilson; 1915 – 1920	Succeeded by Bainbridge Colby
