= Edithvale (disambiguation) =

Edithvale is a suburb in Melbourne, Victoria, Australia.

Edithvale may also refer to:

- Edithvale railway station, a station located on the Frankston line in Victoria, Australia
- Edithvale-Seaford Wetlands, a group of two principally freshwater swamps in south-eastern Victoria

== See also ==
- Edith Daley (1876–1948), San Jose city librarian and poet
- Edith Vane-Tempest-Stewart, Marchioness of Londonderry (1878—1959), a society hostess
