= Marian Longfellow O'Donoghue =

American journalist

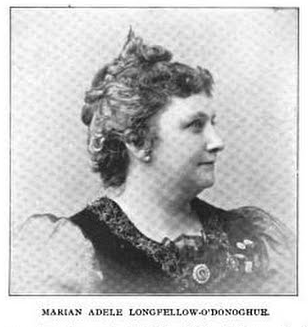
Marian Adele Longfellow O'Donoghue, from an 1896 publication

Marian Adele Longfellow O'Donoghue (April 1, 1849 – January 23, 1924) was an American writer, one of the founders of the National League of American Pen Women, in 1897.

== Early life ==
Marian Adele Longfellow was born in Portland, Maine, the daughter of Stephen Longfellow and Marianne Preble Longfellow. Poet Henry Wadsworth Longfellow was her uncle. Her grandfather, William Pitt Preble, was a judge and diplomat.

== Career ==
Marian Longfellow O'Donoghue wrote poetry and stories for newspapers, collected for publication as Seven Stories of Christmas (1884), The Lily of the Resurrection (1885), Snow Crystals (1885), and Contrasted Songs (1904). She sometimes used the pen named "Miriam Lester." Longfellow also translated Eugène Sue's A Romance of the West Indies from French (1898). Some of her poems were set to music as Christian hymns.

She was a charter member of the Daughters of the American Revolution, a charter member of the National Society of New England Women, and served on the board of directors of the Washington Choral Society.

In 1897, after being rejected for membership in the Washington Press Club, O'Donoghue, Margaret Sullivan Burke, and Anna Sanborn Hamilton co-founded the National League of American Pen Women. O'Donoghue wrote the organization's bylaws and constitution. She was the only woman elected to the executive committee of the International League of Press Clubs in 1898. She was a "prominent member" of the California State Association in Washington D. C. while her husband was serving as president of that organization in 1906.

== Personal life ==
Marian Longfellow married twice: first to Englishman William Morris, with whom she had three children. They divorced. Her second marriage was to Michael Francis O'Donoghue, an Irishman and fellow writer. She was widowed when he died in 1921. Marian Longfellow died in 1924, aged 74 years, in Shawmut, Tuolumne County, California, where she was living with her son Henry Wadsworth Morris.
