= Ada Jordan Pray =

American composer, teacher, and concert singer

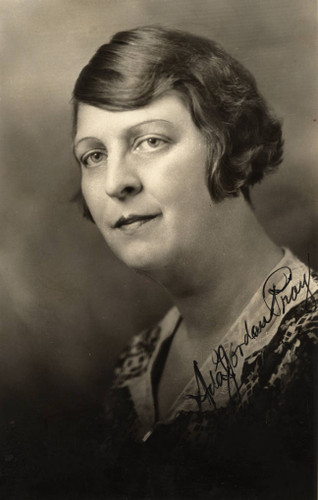
Ada Jordan Pray

Adagerta "Ada" G. Jordan Pray (April 9, 1884 – August 25, 1961), B.L., was a composer, teacher and concert singer, the director of the Ada Jordan Pray Music School.

== Early life ==
Adagerta "Ada" G. Jordan Pray was born on April 9, 1884, in Livermore, California. Her parents Wendell Jordan (1837–1901) and Gertrude Elizabeth Bearer (1858–1941), were of French-Swiss and German extraction. They moved to the United States before the Civil War and had a successfully brewery in Livermore.

She graduated from University of California, Berkeley in 1906.

== Career ==
She was a composer, teacher and concert singer. She was the director of Ada Jordan Pray Music School. She was writer of songs and pianoforte music, she composed: "Veit Knickerbocker," (operetta), Dancing with you, song, words by Maud Gilbert, Swiss Echo Song, words and music, Wishing on a Star in the Valley of the Moon, words by Nell Griffith Wilson, sung by Connie Von Loben Sels, and "Schubertiana": symphony movement in rondo form: to be used with unison chorus if desired. She was a lecturer on Appreciation of Music. For a woman of her time, she travelled extensively abroad.

She was the president of the Social Center of the Oroville Monday Club and of the National Music-Dramatic Honor Society in San Francisco. She was vice-president of the California Music Teachers' Association.

She was a member of the Durham Woman's Club and the Butte County Branch of the National League of American Pen Women.

In 1918 she supervised the addition of the phonograph collection to The Solano County Library, in collaboration with the Victor Phonograph Company.

In 1936 she was appointed to supervise the promotion of musical activities in her district in Butte County, California, where she was assigned the role to make sure all of these musical activities in the district were being directed and developed properly.

== Personal life ==
Ada Jordan Pray moved to Oroville, California, in 1916. In 1915 she married Lee Walker Pray (1881–1958). In 1919 she moved to San Francisco and lived in Stanford Road.

She died on August 25, 1961, and is buried at Chico Memorial Mausoleum and Crematory, Chico, California.

== Legacy ==
The Ada Jordan Pray Papers are preserved at the Special Collections, Meriam Library, California State University, Chico.
