= Harvard–Radcliffe Dramatic Club =

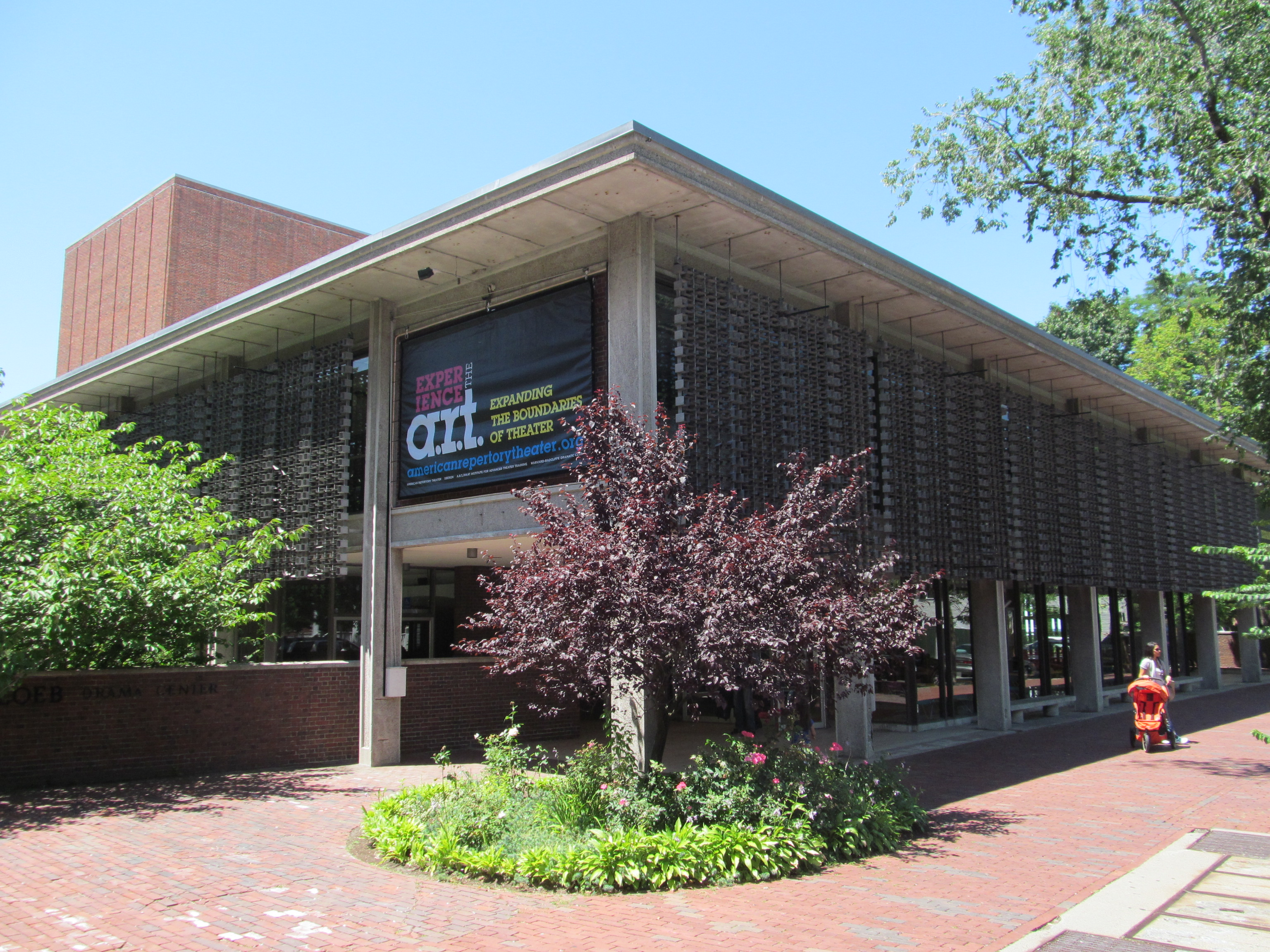
The Loeb Drama Center

The Harvard–Radcliffe Dramatic Club (HRDC), founded in 1908, is an umbrella theater student organization at Harvard College with the purpose of assisting all theatrical projects at the college. It is headquartered at the Loeb Drama Center, the home of the American Repertory Theater. They produce around 10 shows a season, many of which are written by undergraduate students.

== History ==
The club was founded as the Dramatic Club in 1908 by John Reed, Edward Sheldon, and Hans Kaltenborn. It was the first theater group at Harvard to admit women.

== Theaters ==
There are three primary theaters in which HRDC produces shows. Around 2 shows a year happen in the Loeb Proscenium, the largest theater in the Loeb Drama Center. Typically, shows in the proscenium are higher prestige shows, often licensed shows that have had professional runs. Another 6 shows happen in the Loeb Ex, a black box theater in the Loeb Drama Center. These shows are often student written. Another three shows a year happen in the Agassiz Theatre, used in collaboration with the Harvard Office for the Arts. These include the annual First Year Musical, a musical entirely written and performed by freshmen at Harvard College, and a semesterly production of a Gilbert and Sullivan operettas.

== Seasons ==
=== Spring 2024 ===
==== Loeb Ex ====
- Constellations - written by Nick Payne. Directed by Zach Halberstam and Dora Ivkovich, performed by Kyra Siegel and Turandot Shayegan
- Julius Caesar - Presented by Hyperion Shakespeare Company, Written by William Shakespeare, Directed by James GaNun

=== Fall 2023 ===
==== Loeb Proscenium ====
- Heathers: The Musical - Book, Music, and Lyrics by Laurence O'Keefe and Kevin Murphy, Directed by Ava Pallotta
- Jekyll & Hyde - Music by Frank Wildhorn, Book by Leslie Bricusse, Lyrics by Frank Wildhorn, Leslie Bricusse, and Steve Cuden, Directed by Nikhil Kamat

==== Loeb Ex ====
- Hamlet - Presented by Hyperion Shakespeare Company, Written by William Shakespeare, Additional Compositions by Raghav Mehrotra, Emil Droga, and Eleni Dadian, Directed by Maranatha Paul
- In Reverie - Presented by the Harvard-Radcliffe Modern Dance Company, Directed by Tatiana Miranda and Julia Sperling
- under control / utter chaos - Written and co-directed by Chinyere Obasi, co-directed by Texaco Texeira-Ramos
- Breaking Ground - Presented by the Harvard Contemporary Collective, Directed by Payton Thompson

==== Agassiz Theatre ====
- White House Princess - Book, Music, and Lyrics by Maureen Clare and Charlotte Daniels, Directed by Lollie McKenzie
- Footloose - Presented by ¡TEATRO! and Asian Student Arts Project, Book by Dean Pitchford and Walter Bobbie, Music by Tom Snow, Lyrics by Dean Pitchford and Kenny Loggins, Directed by Roseanne Strategos and Cas Li
- BLKS - Presented by Black CAST, Written by Aziza Barnes, Directed by Kayla Bey, Starring Jacqueline Metzger as Octavia, Keely Gorman as June, and Dara Omolaja as Imani.
- Falstaff - Presented by Harvard College Opera, Composed by Giuseppe Verdi, Libretto by Arrigo Boito, Directed by Maranatha Paul

=== Spring 2023 ===
==== Loeb Proscenium ====
- HBC in Love - Presented by the Harvard Ballet Company, Directed by Katharine Stevens and Sophia Barakett
- Natasha, Pierre and the Great Comet of 1812 - Written by Dave Malloy, Adapted from War and Peace by Leo Tolstoy, Directed by Sam Dvorak, Starring Mattheus Carpenter as Pierre, Olympia Hatzilambrou as Natasha, and Connor Riordan as Anatole

==== Loeb Ex ====
- You're A Good Man, Charlie Brown - Book by John Gordon, Lyrics & Music by Clark Gesner, Lyrics & Music Revision by Andrew Lippa, Directed by Nikhil Kamat, Starring Inseo Yeo as Charlie Brown, Ria Cuellar-Koh as Sally Brown, and Matthew Given as Snoopy
- The Bubbly Black Girl Sheds Her Chameleon Skin - Book, Music, and Lyrics by Kirsten Childs, Directed by Kristian Hardy, Starring Ogechi Obi as Viveca, Gabrielle Medina as Mommy, and Jordan Woods as Daddy and Policeman
- Atalanta - Book and Lyrics by Mira-Rose Kingsbury Lee, Composed by Williams Goldsmith, Ben Dreier, Keagan Yap, and Kingsbury Lee, Directed by Kingsbury Lee and Ellie Powell, starring Grace Allen as Sarina Lemonde, Matthew Given as Charlie Saltman, Onovughakpor Otitigbe-Dangerfield as Miriam Lemonde, and Vander Ritchie as William Harding
- [intervals] - Presented by the Harvard–Radcliffe Modern Dance Company, Directed by Julia Sperling and Tatiana Miranda
- Ugly Feelings - Written by Karina Cowperthwaite, Directed by Alycia Cary and Cowperthwaite

==== Agassiz Theatre ====
- The Sorcerer - Written by W.S. Gilbert & Composed by Arthur Sullivan, Directed by Haley Stark
- OUT: An Asian-American Musical - Book by Kalos Chu, Composed by Ian Chan, Lyrics by JuHye Mun, Directed by Chu, Starring Fahim Ahmed as Oliver, Carolyn Hao as May, and Elio Kennedy-Yoon as Kasey
- Post Mortem: The First Year Musical - Book by Paul Palmer, Lyrics by Eleni Daidan, Music by Christian Liu, Directed by Lollie McKenzie

=== Fall 2022 ===
==== Loeb Proscenium ====
- In the Heights - Presented by ¡TEATRO!, Music and Lyrics by Lin-Manuel Miranda, Book by Quiara Alegría Hudes, Directed by Aviva Ramirez
- Something Rotten! - Presented by the Hyperion Shakespeare Company, Music and Lyrics by Wayne and Karey Kirkpatrick, Book by Karey Kirkpatrick and John O'Farrell, Directed by Sam Dvorak

==== Loeb Ex ====
- metamorphosis - Presented by the Harvard–Radcliffe Modern Dance Company, Directed by Mira Becker and Karina Halevy
- Queen of Magic - Book and Lyrics by Andrew Van Camp, Music by Veronica Leahy, Directed by Ellie Powell, Starring Devon Gates as Adele, Cybele Fasquelle as Adelaide Herrmann, and William Murray as Charles
- The Effect - Written by Lucy Prebble, Directed by Mira Alpers and Kyra Siegel

==== Agassiz Theatre ====
- ISCARIOT - Book & Lyrics by Sophie Kim, Music by Lucas Pao and Jude Torres, Directed by Cas Li and Caren Koh, Starring Hailey Madison Sebastian as Judas, Saswato Ray as Isaiah, and Hailey Hurd as Jesus
- Iolanthe; or, The Peer and the Peri - Written by W.S. Gilbert, Composed by Arthur Sullivan, Directed by Nick Fahy
- Mira, Mira - Book and Lyrics by Victoria Gong, Music by Keagan Yap, Directed by Eileen Tucci, Starring Onovughakpor Otitigbe-Dangerfield as Mira, James GaNun as John, and Maddie Dowd as Zephyr

== Notable alumni ==
- Richard Aldrich, theater producer and director
- Leonard Bernstein, composer
- Matt Damon, actor
- Donald Davidson, philosopher
- Andrew Barth Feldman, actor/composer
- Caroline Giuliani, filmmaker
- Ketanji Brown Jackson, current associate justice on the US Supreme Court
- Rashida Jones, actor
- John Lithgow, actor
- B. J. Novak, actor
- Laurence O'Keefe, composer
- Julia Riew, actor/composer
- Mo Rocca, journalist
- Helen Shaw, theater critic
- C. Antoinette Wood, early 20th century American woman author and playwright
