= George Pierce Baker =

American educator and dramatic arts academic

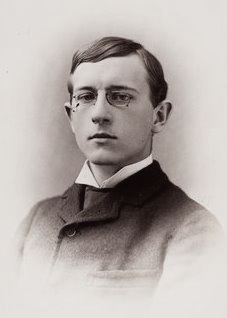
Baker c. 1886

George Pierce Baker (April 4, 1866 – January 6, 1935) was a professor of English at Harvard and Yale and author of Dramatic Technique, a codification of the principles of drama.

== Biography ==
Baker graduated in the Harvard College class of 1887, served as Editor-in-Chief of The Harvard Monthly, and taught in the English Department at Harvard from 1888 until 1924. He started his "47 workshop" class in playwriting in 1905. He was instrumental in creating the Harvard Theatre Collection at Harvard University Library. In 1908 he began the Harvard Dramatic Club, acting as its sponsor, and in 1912 he founded the 47 Workshop to provide a forum for the performance of plays developed within his English class. He was elected a Fellow of the American Academy of Arts and Sciences in 1914. Unable to persuade Harvard to offer a degree in playwriting, he moved to Yale University in 1925, where he helped found the Yale School of Drama. He remained there until his retirement in 1933.

Baker was Hyde lecturer and taught a seminar on Shakespeare and English drama at the Sorbonne University (Paris) in 1907-08. He lectured at other French universities and gave several series of lectures at Lowell Institute. He has edited books on drama and written several himself, including Shakespeare's Development as a Dramatist (1907). His Dramatic Technique (1919) offered a codification in English of the principles of the well-made play.

George Pierce Baker was the father of George P. Baker who was dean of Harvard Business School.

== The 47 Workshop at Harvard ==
Baker wrote of the 47 Workshop:

In 1913 the Workshop began. From the beginning it has depended almost wholly on itself, doing all the work except for the making of scenery flats and some of the bulky properties. It occupies the lower floor of Massachusetts Hall, one of the oldest of the Harvard buildings. Students are admitted in English 47 and 47A, the two courses in playwriting. These appear also in the curriculum of Radcliffe, the woman's college. To get from the first group (47) to the second group (47A) is by competition; students in the former submitting June 1 of each year manuscripts of one act plays. Prof. Baker passes on these and forms the next year's band of aspiring playwrights out of the winning men. And these students write the plays that are acted in the theater of Massachusetts Hall in the next term, put on the stage by the director or his aids and criticized by the classes.

Participants in the 47 Workshop include the following:

- George Abbott
- Christina Hopkinson Baker
- Faith Baldwin
- Charlotte Rebecca Woglom Bangs
- Philip Barry
- Mary Porter Beegle
- S.N. Behrman
- Rachel Barton Butler
- Henry Fisk Carlton
- Hallie Flanagan
- Kenneth Sawyer Goodman
- Dorothy Heyward
- Ben Hecht
- Sidney Howard
- Samuel Hume
- Lute Johnson
- Charles Augustus Keeler
- Edward Morrell Massey
- Stanley McCandless
- Eugene O'Neill
- Hubert Osborne
- Josephine Preston Peabody
- Eugene Pillot
- Channing Pollock (writer)
- Kenneth Raisbeck
- Florence Ryerson
- Edward Sheldon
- Elizabeth Higgins Sullivan
- Chauncey Brewster Tinker
- Josephine Van De Grift
- Adelaide E. Wadsworth
- Maurine Dallas Watkins
- Thomas Wolfe
- C. Antoinette Wood
- Robert Sterling Yard
- Robert Mearns Yerkes
- Stark Young
