= Christina Hopkinson Baker =

20th cent. American woman playwright author

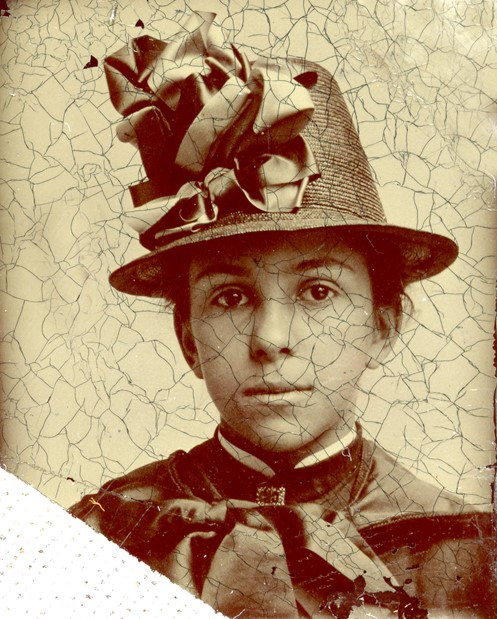
- Christina Hopkinson Baker
- Born: Christina Hopkinson; August 2, 1873; Cambridge, Massachusetts, U.S.
- Died: November 30, 1959 (aged 86); New Haven, Connecticut, U.S.
- Occupations: writer, playwright
- Spouse: George Pierce Baker (m. 1893)
- Children: 3, including George Pierce Baker
- Writing career
- Years active: 1893-1930
- Genre: short stories

Christina Hopkinson Baker (2 Aug 1873 – 30 Nov 1959), was an early 20th century American author and playwright.

== Personal life ==
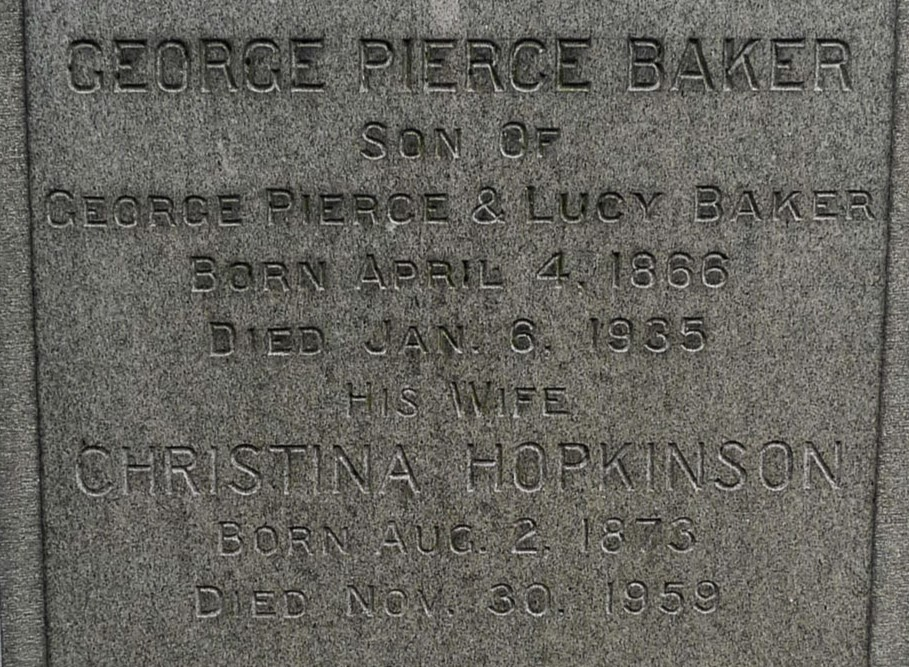
Grave of Christina Hopkinson Baker

She was born in Columbus, Nebraska, to John Prentiss Hopkinson and Mary Elizabeth Watson. Her siblings are Leslie W., Charles Sydney, and Frances. Her children are John Hopkinson Baker, Edwin Osborne Baker, and George Pierce Baker. She is the spouse of George Pierce Baker, a professor of English at Harvard and Yale and author of Dramatic Technique, a codification of the principles of drama.

== Career ==
She graduated from Radcliffe College in 1892 and was an acting dean and trustee there. She was a lecturer, historian, and genealogist who authored several books. She also lived in New Haven, Connecticut where her husband, a renowned drama teacher and critic, was a professor and creator of the Department of Drama at Yale.

She is an alumna of her husband's, Dr. George Pierce Baker Workshop 47 at Harvard University in Cambridge, Massachusetts.

A First edition 1929 of her book The Story of Fay House is inscribed with: Wm. Nelson Smith Great-grandson of Judge Samuel P.P. Fay and grandson of Rev. Charles Fay DD who is mentioned p 61 + p. 87. Oct. 19. 1929." With a contemporary review pasted onto the rear pastedown. A history of a home that became the center of Radcliffe College, a prestigious women's college that is now part of Harvard University.

== Selected bibliography ==
- Diary and Letters of Josephine Preston Peabody, Houghton Mifflin Company, The Riverside Press Cambridge, 1925
- A Porringer of Cockney: The Story of the Land and House now Owned by the Visiting Nurse Association at 35 Elm Street, New Haven, 1930
- The Story of Fay House, Harvard University Press, 1929

The Library of Congress - National Union Catalog of Manuscripts Collection has the Christina Hopkinson Baker papers, 1932–1963, containing correspondence, notes, newspaper clippings, reference files, and other papers, relating to the history and architecture of New Haven buildings and other topics. She is also listed as one of the authors on the Papers of E. E. Cummings, also held at the Library of Congress.
