= National League of American Pen Women =

Membership organization for women

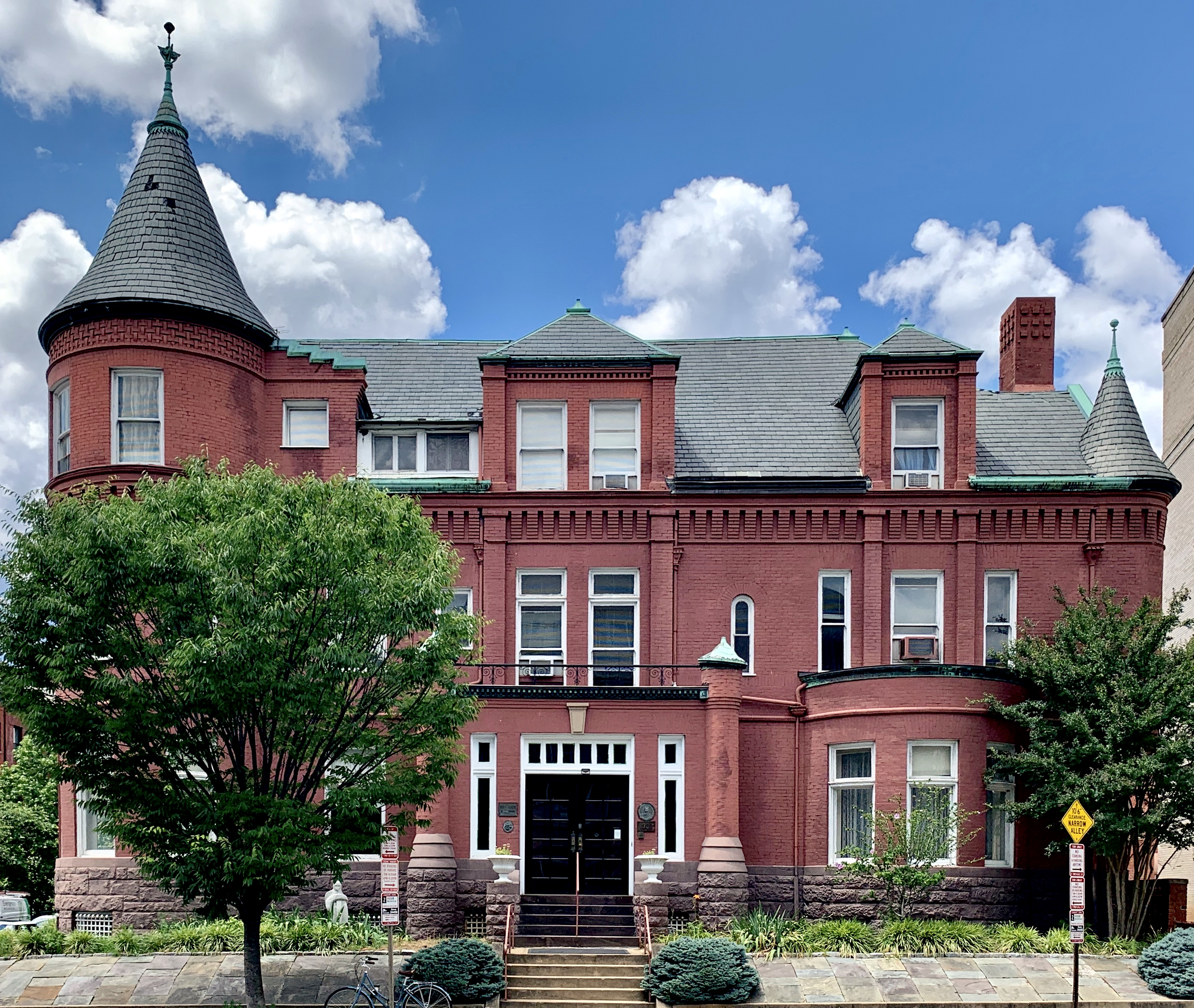
National League of American Pen Women headquarters in Washington, D.C.

The National League of American Pen Women, Inc. (NLAPW) is a not-for-profit 501(c)(3) membership organization for women.

== History ==
The first meeting of the League of American Pen Women was organized in 1897 by Marian Longfellow O'Donoghue, a writer for newspapers in Washington D.C. and Boston. Together with Margaret Sullivan Burke and Anna Sanborn Hamilton they established a "progressive press union" for the women writers of Washington."

Seventeen women joined them at first, professional credentials were required for membership and the ladies determined that Pen Women should always be paid for their work. By September 1898, members were over fifty members "from Maine to Texas, from New York to California."

In 1921, with 5,000 members, Mrs. William Atherton du Puy (née Ada Lee Orme also Mrs. Ada Lee Orme du Puy), was National President (for two years) of the League of American Pen Women, and the association became The National League of American Pen Women with thirty-five local branches, in Syracuse, NY, Tampa, Denver, Minnesota, and various states.

William Atherton du Puy (1876-1941) was a New York Times reporter, author, and "press agent" of Ray Lyman Wilbur as United States Secretary of the Interior. and named Hooverball as Boone-ball.

The League's headquarters are located in the historic Pen Arts Building and Art Museum in the DuPont Circle area of Washington.

== Notable members ==
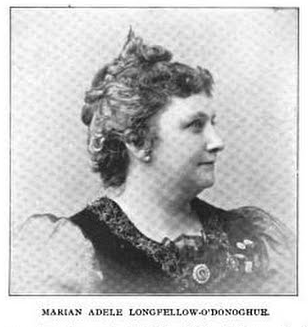
Marian Adele Longfellow O'Donoghue, from an 1896 publication

- Daisy Kessler Biermann
- Amy Ella Blanchard
- Anne Bozeman Lyon
- Gail Horton Calmerton
- Sarah Johnson Cocke
- Margaret Wootten Collier
- Edith Daley
- Bernice C. Downing
- Caroline B. Eager
- Alice Henson Ernst
- Inglis Fletcher
- May Futrelle
- Gladys Goldstein
- Alice Rogers Hager
- Jeanette Lawrence
- Nancy A. Leatherwood
- Annie Guinn Massey
- E. Jean Nelson Penfield (1872-1961), co-founder, League of Women Voters; National President, Kappa Kappa Gamma
- Ada Jordan Pray
- Edith Daggett Rockwood
- Vingie E. Roe
- Eleanor Roosevelt (1884-1962), American political figure, diplomat, and activist
- Geneve L. A. Shaffer
- Lura Eugenie Brown Smith
- Margaret McClure Stitt
- Julia H. Thayer (1847-1944), poet and educator
- Grace Hyde Trine
- An-Ming Wang
- Margaret Hicks Williams
- C. Antoinette Wood (1867-1942), writer and playwright
- Elenor Yorke
- Zitkala-Sa
