= Gail Horton Calmerton =

American educator (1861–1950)

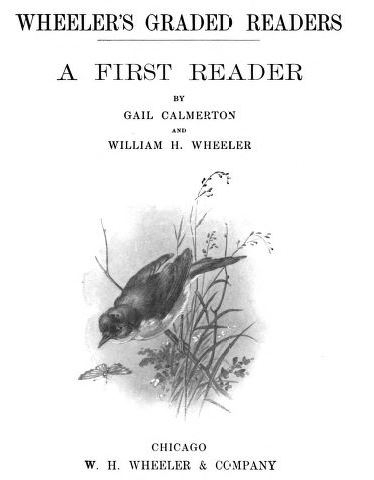
Wheeler's graded readers, a first reader by Gail Calmerton and William H. Wheeler

Gail Horton Calmerton (November 2, 1861 – February 5, 1950) was an educator and a charter member of the National Council of Primary Education.

== Early life ==
Gail Horton Calmerton was born on November 2, 1861, in Wisconsin, the daughter of E. Rudolph and M. Rougene Calmerton.

Calmerton was a graduate of State Normal school in Oshkosh, Wisconsin, and University of Chicago.

== Career ==
Gail Calmerton was interested in all civic and educational matters.

Calmerton was a former Supervisor of Primary Education in the Public Schools of Fort Wayne, Indiana, before moving to California. The first primary supervisor was Annie Klingensmith, hired in 1899, a graduate of State Normal School in Indiana, PA, and Oswego Normal School in New York. Calmerton replaced Klingensmith in 1905, when Klingensmith resigned to accept a similar position in Paterson, New Jersey, and Calmerton served in that position until 1923.

Calmerton wrote educational articles, children's stories and verse. She was the coauthor, together with William Henry Wheeler (1854-1936), of "Wheeler Graded Readers" and author: "Practical Projects, Plays and Games" (book for teachers).

For many years Calmerton was institute instructor and lecturer in theory and practice of primary work.

Calmerton was a member of the University Women's Club, American Pen Women, and the National Council of Primary Education (charter member).

== Personal life ==
Gail Calmerton was a resident of California since 1923 and lived at 2344 Fort Stockton Drive, San Diego, California.

Calmerton died on February 5, 1950, and is buried at Forest Lawn Memorial Park (Glendale), Section: Col. of Patience, Iris Terr, Map #: 1, Lot: 0, Space: 21356, Property: Niche.

== Legacy ==
Gail Calmerton was the donor of "The Gail Calmerton Teachers' and Juvenile Library" (2,000 volumes), Fort Wayne, Indiana: the library board received a check for $1,000 to be used to create a trust fund to purchase children's books.

In 1952 the Regents of University of California, Berkeley, established The Gail H. Calmerton Scholarships, two scholarships of $1,200 each open to worthy and needy students in any department of the University, using the funds presented by Calmerton.
