= C. Antoinette Wood =

20th cent. American woman playwright author

- Born: Cora Antoinette Binninger; July 1, 1867; Brownville, New York, U.S.
- Died: May 29, 1942 (aged 74); Brookline, Massachusetts, U.S.
- Occupations: writer, poet, playwright
- Spouse: George Edmond Wood (m. 1893)
- Writing career
- Years active: 1918-1942
- Genre: short stories
- Notable awards: Harvard Workshop 47 for screenplay "Buying Culture"; 1921

C. Antoinette Wood (Jul 1867 – 29 May 1942), was an early 20th century American author and playwright. She was known for being an author of Easy Parliamentary Procedure (3rd ed. published) and for being an author of ten plays which were produced and several of which were published. She published articles in the Boston Transcript and other magazines, winning two prizes for her stories. Wood also lectured on drama and dramatists.

== Early life and education ==
She was born in Brownville, New York. Her parents were Catherine Vogt and Henry Binninger, a German immigrant to New York.

She attended Houghton Female Seminary, Clinton, N. Y. and Radcliffe College (1918–20). She was an alumna of Dr. George Pierce Baker's Workshop 47 at Harvard. in Cambridge, Mass.

== Career ==
She was a professional writer, lecturer, and dramatist from 1918 onward. Both a poet and a painter. She also saw 10 of her plays produced. She worked with George Pierce Baker's Harvard Workshop 47 at Boston, Massachusetts. Afterwards, she stayed and married husband, George E. Wood, whom she lived with in Brookline, Massachusetts until her death in 1942. An authority on parliamentary law, she was well known for her book, Easy Parliamentary Procedure A well-known playwright and a director of the "47 Workshop", she had to her credit a number of poems, several plays, and the book and lyrics of a musical play Why Not? produced in Boston.

Prominent in both the Boston branch of the National Society of American Pen Women (1933–36) and in the national organization, she was a vice president (1929–31) and parliamentarian (1934) of the New England Woman's Press Association. Her clubs were the Radcliffe College Club, Harvard Workshop 47 (past 1st vice president), the Women's Republican Club, the American Association of University Women, and the Manuscript Club of Boston (president, 2 years).

== Legacy ==
The Special Collections research team at Syracuse University has a finding aid for the C. Antoinette Wood Papers.

== Awards ==
In 1925, her play, Buying Culture was selected for the Boston Theatre Guild plays for the 1925 season.

With an introduction by Frank W. C. Hersey, A.M., Instructor of English, Harvard University. A collection of five plays. One of them being "Buying Culture" by C. Antoinette Wood - one male, two females. These unusual plays have been selected because they were especially liked by the audiences which attended the first performances of them by the Theatre Guild of Boston. They differ in mood and purpose..."

— Baker's Plays, Boston, Mass.

Ten years later, Buying Culture, one of her more performed plays, was still growing strong and a winner for final selection for one-act plays in 1935.

At the 1940 biennial convention of the National League of American Pen Women, she won first prize for her feature writing Martha Washington at Valley Forge. She was awarded a black onyx compact brought back from Paris by Miss George Elliston, of Cincinnati.

Also in 1940, she won for her play A Fighting Chance at a rally of U.S. Pen Women. The headline read Brookline Woman Wins First Prize. Her play was "played before an audience by an all-professional cast".

== Selected works ==
- Buying Culture Harvard, 1921
- The Come-back, or, There With the Goods
- Dividends from an Investment of Spare Time
- Eve Started It
- A Fighting Chance
- The Greatest of These
- Harootune
- Her Price
- He Never Lied to His Wife
- His Chance Harvard, 1921.
- Martha Washington at Valley Forge, c1940
- A Matter of Convenience
- A Modern Solomon, or, He Knew Women
- Nothing in Common
- One Hundred Selected Recipes From the Experience of Chafing Dish Enthusiasts Buffalo, McLaughlin Pr., cop. 1904, 1937.
- Our Common Cause, Civilization [Proceedings of the International Congress of Women, July 16–22, 1933, Chicago, Illinois] (New York, NY: National Council of Women of the United States, 1933), 1–992. With Anita Browne.
- Partners
- The Spellbinder
- The Split Second
- Trent of the Navy
- Under the Thorn Tree
- The Unknown Lady
- A Wash-lady
- Why Not?, a musical
- Why Save Time?
- Wired Together
- The Women Builders
- The World's Fair Anthology, 1939 (includes the poem 'Fidelity')
