= Daisy Kessler Biermann =

American writer and painter

Daisy Edith Kessler Biermann
- Born: August 24, 1874; Cleveland, Ohio, U.S.
- Died: September 21, 1963
- Occupations: Writer, painter, pianist
- Years active: Early 1900s–mid-20th century
- Organizations: American Pen Women, San Diego Fine Arts Society, Art Guild, Wednesday Club, Woman's Press Club, Amphion Club
- Notable work: Editor of the San Diego Union Women's Section
- Spouse: Francis Xavier Joseph Biermann

Daisy Edith Kessler Biermann (August 24, 1874 – September 21, 1963) was an American magazine and newspaper writer, a painter, and a pianist.

== Early life ==
Daisy Edith Kessler was born in Cleveland, Ohio, on August 24, 1874, the daughter of Philip L. Kessler and Sarah Hall.

== Career ==
For twenty-five years Daisy Kessler Biermann was the editor of the Women's Section and music and art critic of the San Diego Union.

She was actively identified with art and musical development of the city, authoring a large number of published short stories and magazine articles.

She was a member of: American Pen Women (San Diego Branch), San Diego Fine Arts Society, Art Guild, Wednesday Club, San Diego Woman's Press Club, Amphion Club.

== Personal life ==
Daisy Kessler moved to California in 1898 with her family and lived at El Cajon, California. The J. P. R. Hall and Phil Kessler families ran the Hall & Kessler lumberyard.

In 1913, Kessler married her colleague at The Sacramento Union, Francis Xavier Joseph Biermann, a political reporter.

Biermann died on September 21, 1963.
