= Caroline B. Eager =

American philanthropist (1862-1929)

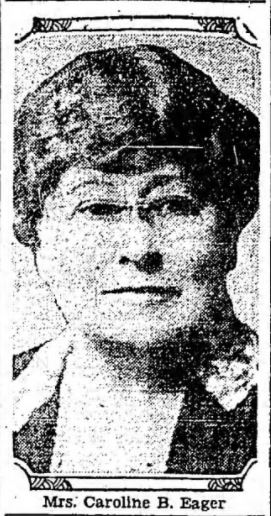
- Born: Caroline Burnett Boss; May 15, 1862; Newport, Rhode Island, US
- Died: October 9, 1929 (aged 67); Boston, Massachusetts, US
- Occupations: Musician, philanthropist

Caroline B. Eager (May 15, 1862 – October 9, 1929) was an American philanthropist and educator who worked mainly with the Igorot people of the Philippine Islands. Before her work in the Philippines she had a career as a musician.

== Early life and education ==
Caroline Burnett Eager was born on May 15, 1862, to Robert and Clarissa Boss in Newport, Rhode Island. She was a direct descendant of John Howard of Plymouth. She spent most of her early years in Boston.

She graduated from the Girls' High School in Boston, Massachusetts, in 1883 and from the New England Conservatory of Music. She continued her education throughout her life, studying at American schools of Japan and the Philippines, a Parisian academy, and Auckenthaler in Lausanne, Switzerland.

== Career ==
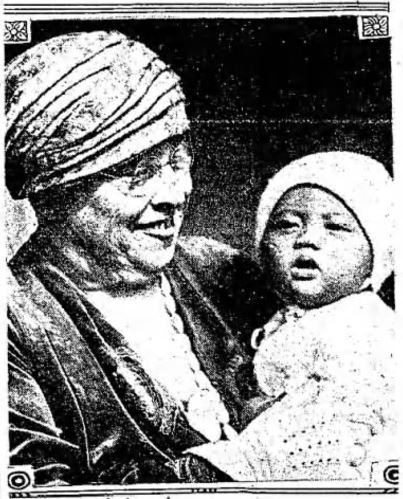
Eager in 1928

Eager became a pianist, organist, and teacher, and was a member of the Handel and Haydn Society for many years. She also lectured on a variety of topics including music, literature, and foreign affairs.

She taught music to the Igorot people of the Philippine Islands. She supported a school at Baguio for the education of the children. She also selected twelve Igorots from her school and brought them to her home in Los Angeles, California at her own expense, and trained them in ways which would be of value when they returned to their people.

She was a supervisor of music in public schools in Rhode Island. She contributed to the Boston Daily Globe and several East Coast magazines.

== Memberships ==
She was a founder and president of the Los Angeles branch of the Dickens Fellowship. She was a founding member of the Hollywood Bowl, the Los Angeles Oratorio Society, the Cadman Creative Club, the Opera and Fine Arts Club, and the Shakespeare Club.

She was a charter member of the American Woman's Club in Paris and a member of the American Woman's Club in London. She was an honorary member of the Saturday Morning Club in Kobe, Japan, since its founding in 1914. She was also a life member of the Friday Morning Club. Her other memberships include of the Southern California Women's Press Club, the American Pen Women, the Descendant of Mayflower, the Daughters of the American Revolution, the English-Speaking Union, the Pan-Pacific Club, the Pacific Geographic Society, and the Matinee Musicale.

== Personal life ==
Eager married Robert R. Thompson in 1882, but he died seven years later in Aiken, South Carolina. She moved to Los Angeles in 1907 and resided there for 21 years. She lived at 2511 Third Ave. While in Los Angeles she married Charles Henry Eager of Boston, to whom she was married for nine years until his death. She was member of The First Church of Christ, Scientist.

== Death ==
Eager died on October 9, 1929, at the home of her lifelong friend, Mrs. Stanley P. Clemens, 198 Bay State Road, Boston. She had come to Boston for a brief stay prior to embarking on her fourth trip around the world, with plans to visit Paris, Egypt, and Manila, but changed her plans and decided to spend the winter in Boston. The night before her death, she had been the principal speaker at a meeting of the Boston Dickens Fellowship in the Arlington Street Church parish hall. Upon leaving the venue, she complained of faintness. She reached Clemens's home and doctors and nurses were summoned as she lapsed into a coma, from which she did not regain consciousness.
