= Elizabeth Higgins Sullivan =

20th cent. American woman playwright author (1872 –1953)

- Born: Elizabeth "Bessie" K. Higgins; December 14, 1872; Columbus, Nebraska, U.S.
- Died: January 30, 1953 (aged 80); Miami, Ohio, U.S.
- Occupations: writer, playwright
- Spouse: name Florence Edward Sullivan (m. 1896)
- Children: 1, Janette (Janet)
- Writing career
- Years active: 1902-1938
- Genre: short stories
- Notable awards: Harvard Workshop 47 for screenplay "The Strongest Man"; 1925

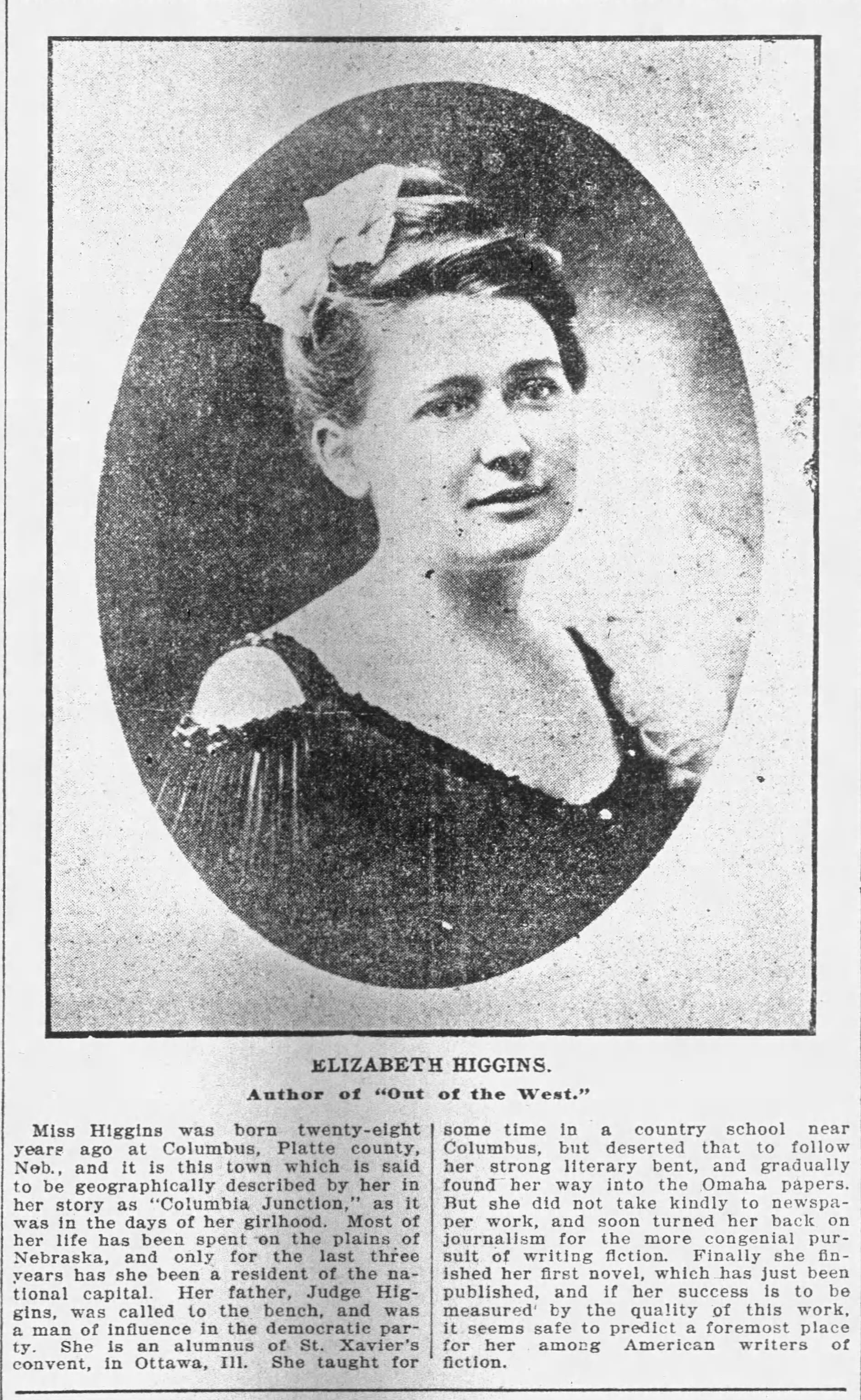
Elizabeth Higgins, author of Out of the West 1902

Elizabeth Higgins Sullivan (14 Dec 1872 – 30 Jan 1953), was an early 20th century American woman author and playwright. She was born in Columbus, Nebraska to Judge John G. Higgins and Anna O'Connor. Her siblings are John, Joy, Edward, Frank, Pansy, Mary, Andrea, Andrew, and Kathleen. Three of her siblings passed in infancy.

Elizabeth married Florence Edward Sullivan on April 11, 1896, in Omaha, Nebraska. Soon after, her daughter, Janette was born in 1906. The couple divorced and she did not remarry. She published her stories under her maiden name of Elizabeth Higgins.

Sullivan worked for the Omaha Daily Bee newspaper and various Chicago daily newspapers. She was devoted to women's suffrage and the social settlement movement. She had a special interest in horticulture and wrote numerous articles on horticulture and agriculture in the American South. She maintained a home in the Mobile, Alabama area for a part of the year, later in life. She is listed in the 1916 Blue Book of Nebraska Women by Winona Reeves under the Sullivan surname.

An entry in the 1916 Blue Book of Nebraska Women page 218 reads:

MRS. ELIZABETH HIGGINS SULLIVAN
Surnames: Sullivan, O'Conor, Higgins

Elizabeth Higgins Sullivan was born in Columbus, Neb., Dec 14, 1875. She is the
daughter of John G. and Anna (O'Connor) Higgins and is a sister of Joy Higgins, whose
biography appears elsewhere in this book. Mrs. Sullivan was educated at St. Francis
Xavier's Academy at Ottawa, Ill. She was married in Omaha, Neb., April 11, 1896, and is
now a widow. She has one daughter, Janet Campbell Sullivan, who was born in
Washington, D. C., Nov. 30, 1901. Mrs Sullivan was for years a newspaper woman as
department editor and special feature writer. She worked on the Omaha Bee Staff and
later with various Chicago dailies. She is the author of "Out of the West" and other short
stories, writing under her maiden name, Elizabeth Higgins. She has written many articles
on horticulture, particularly to the raising of pecan nuts, to flower culture, and the
scientific care of fruit trees. She spends the greater part of the year in Mobile Co., Ala.,
near Grand Bay, where she studies and experiments in horticulture. She is a member of the
National Grower' Union, of the Alabama Horticulture Society and of the Agricultural
Society. In the years in which she lived in Chicago and Washington she was active in the
work of woman suffrage and in social settlement work She is a Episcopalian and is
actively interested in the home mission work of the denomination.

== Career ==
Sullivan worked for several newspapers and schools including the Omaha Bee newspaper, Omaha Daily News, South End Music School, and University Players of Cape Cod and Baltimore. She was a reporter, social worker, and art director. Working with her sister Joy, a distinguished teacher of dramatics who, through the University Players of Boston and New York, helped to start many prominent stage and screen stars on their way to the top.

Her book Out of the West, a Novel by Elizabeth Higgins was written in 1902. It is "A captivating story of a young woman's journey from the rural West to the vibrant city of San Francisco in the early 1900s. Full of vivid descriptions and colorful characters, this novel explores themes of identity, love, and self-discovery."

The book was digitized in June 2014 from the original held at the New York Public Library. Several modern reprints have been done on her work, as it is in the public domain, and her work has been selected by scholars as being culturally important, and is therefore "important enough to be preserved, reproduced, and made generally available to the public".

She is an alumna of Dr. George Pierce Baker's Workshop 47 at Harvard University in Cambridge, Massachusetts. In 1925, her play "The Strongest Man" was called "Best of Series" from other Workshop 47 entries.

== Selected bibliography ==
- The Strongest Man. 1925 (play)
- Out of the West: A Novel by Elizabeth Higgins Sullivan; publisher: Harper & brothers, 1902. Original from the New York Public Library; Digitized, Jun 24, 2014; Length, 313 pages. Modern reprints of this book carry ISBN 9781357445768, and 9781022193277.
- A Roof Against the Rain, by Elizabeth Higgins. Published by Lothrop, Lee & Shepard company; Boston/New York, 1938. First edition held at the library of Congress.
- The Chisholm Trail
