= An-Ming Wang =

Chinese-American composer and pianist

An-Ming Wang is the pen name of Chinese-American composer and pianist Marion Wang Mak (born November 7, 1926).

== Biography ==
Wang was born in Shanghai to Cheng Hsu and Eling Wang. Both of her parents were educated in the United States. Her mother majored in music at Wellesley College, where she studied piano. Although Wang grew up in China, her parents exposed her to Western music throughout her childhood.

Wang holds a Bachelor of Engineering degree from Central China University. She immigrated to the United States in 1948, then received a Bachelor of Music degree rom Wesleyan Conservatory (now Wesleyan College) and a Master of Arts degree in music education from Columbia University. She also studied at the Juilliard School. She married William Mak.

Wang's compositions have received awards from the National League of American Pen Women and the American Society of Composers, Authors, and Publishers (ASCAP). She has also received a grant from the Maryland State Arts Council. Her works have been performed in Washington, D.C. at the White House, the John F. Kennedy Center for the Performing Arts, the National Gallery of Art, and the Corcoran Gallery of Art, as well as at Carnegie Hall in New York City, and the Spoleto Music Festival in Charleston, South Carolina.

Wang is a member of ASCAP, Friday Morning Music Club, International Alliance for Women in Music, National Federation of Music Clubs, National League of American Pen Women, Sigma Alpha Iota; and the Southeastern Composers League. Her music has been published by Hildegarde Publishing.

== Compositions ==
Wang's compositions include:

=== Chamber ===
Dialogue (flute, clarinet and piano; 1983)

East Wind (flute or violin and piano; 1982)

Jestures (flute, clarinet and piano; 1983)

Kapalua (flute and piano)

Octet (woodwinds; 2018)

Promenade (woodwind, brass and timpani; 1980)

Scenes from Pingchow (violin, viola, cello and piano; 1981)

Solemn Silhouettes (flute and piano)

Sonata for violin and piano (1978)

Suite for Flute, Clarinet and Piano (1983)

=== Opera ===
Lan Ying

=== Orchestra ===
Homeless Child (ballet suite)

Introduction and Allegro (1982)

Symphonic Projections (1977)

=== Piano/organ ===
Arabesque (1978)

Concerto (piano and orchestra)

Dance Chinois (1978)

Fantasy for Solo Organ Vivace Press, 2001.

Interludes (1979)

Mahjong Suite (1977)

Mystic Moments, for organ (2009)

Petite Valse (1978)

Soundings for Organ (2000)

Toccata (1979)

=== Vocal ===
Agnus Dei (men's chorus; 1981)

Anna Meets Baby Jesus (children's chorus; 1977)

Autumn Leaves (mixed chorus; 1978)

"Autumn Winds" (soprano and piano; 1974)

Chinese Lullaby (children's chorus; 1980)

Christmas Gift (children's chorus; 1980)

"Come My Love" (voice and piano; 1975)

"Dazzling Jewels" (voice and piano)

Fairy Hill Upon the Void Obscure

Gloria (chorus and orchestra)

God Created People (children's chorus; 1979)

Hundred Loves

"In Eternal Wedlock Bliss" (female voice; 1977)

In Paradisum (chorus; 1982)

Introit (mixed chorus; 1980)

"Kyrie" (soprano and alto; 1981)

Let All the World in Every Corner Sing (mixed chorus, trumpet, trombone and organ)

Libera Me (mixed chorus; 1982)

Life's Dreary Gloom

"Little Yellow Bird" (soprano and piano; 1980)

Lux Aeterna (mixed chorus; 1981)

Mary's Lullaby (mixed chorus)

"Nightingale" (soprano; 1978)

Nights of Spring

"O Glorious Morn" (voice and piano; 1977)

O Praise the Lord (mixed chorus; 1976)

Offertoire (bass and mixed chorus; 1981)

"Pie Jesu" (tenor and bass; 1981)

Rain of Night

Requiem (mixed chorus and orchestra; 1982)

Sanctus (women's chorus; 1981)

"Sky" (female voice; 1980)

"Song of Endless Sorrow" (soprano; 1976)

"Songs for All Seasons" (voice and piano; 1982)

"Spring Rain" (soprano and alto)

War's Alarms
