= Fiona Scott Lazareff =

British magazine editor and women's activist

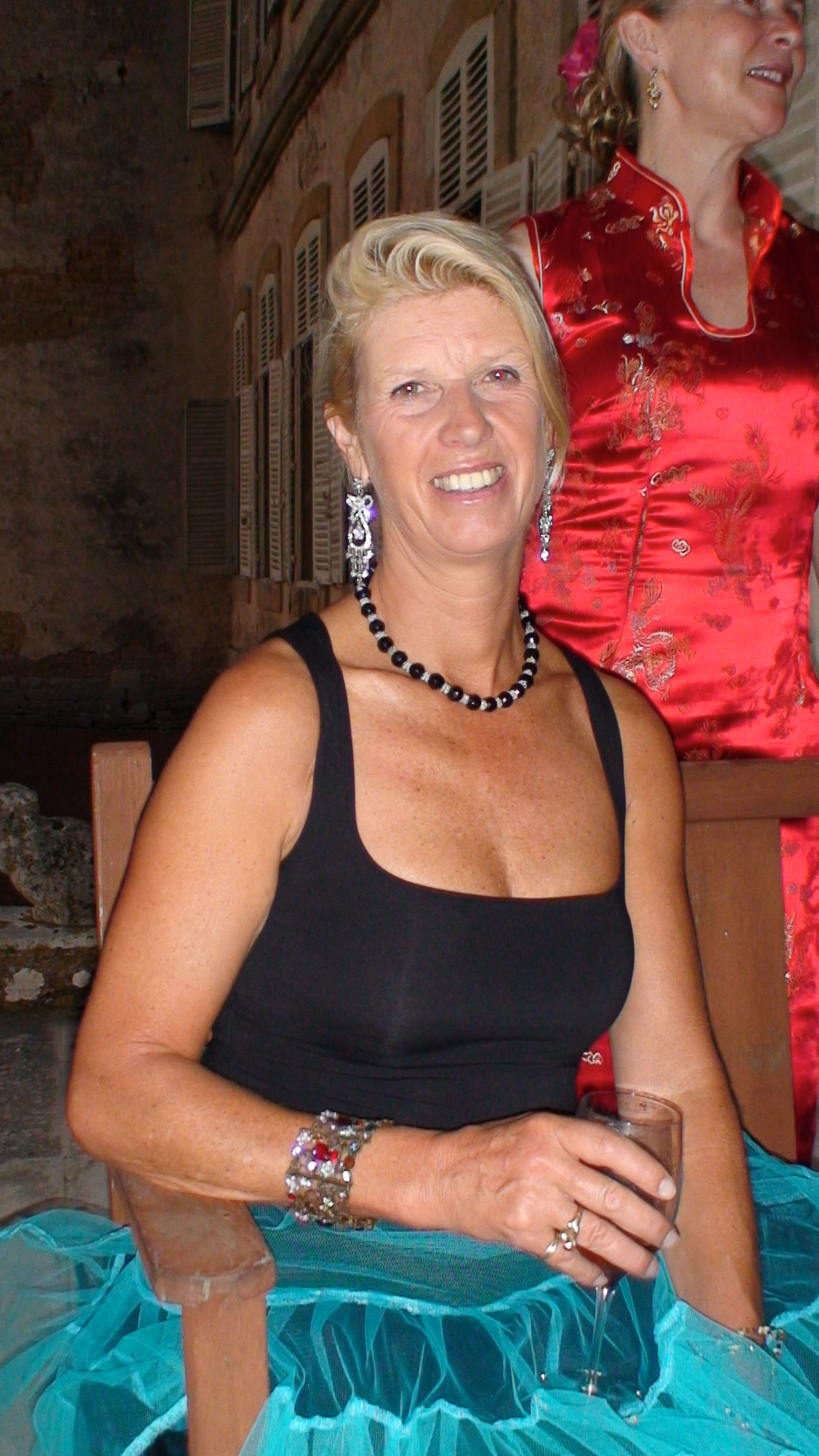
Fiona Scott Lazareff

Fiona Scott Lazareff is an activist and has created various campaigns to support social justice and women's entrepreneurship in technology.

== Career ==
Lazareff began her career working as an economist for Carr Sebag where she launched “International Strategy” a monthly newsletter on international asset management in 1980. In 1981 she moved to Hong Kong to work for WI Carr and Hoare Govett as a financial analyst and in 1982 she moved to New York to work for Samuel Montagu.

She then moved to Paris where she raised €650,000 (3,2MF) from financial institutions to create Mediatime France SA, and to launch several publications including, in 1990, the English-language lifestyle magazine Boulevard. She also co-founded the Crillon Debutantes Ball, a fashion show in which young aristocratic women appeared.

Lazareff is currently editor-in-chief and majority shareholder of Divento, a website devoted to European culture launched by Vivendi Universal in 2001.

== Notable Campaigns ==
=== Right2Justice.co.uk ===
Lazareff started campaigning in 2019 to reform the legal system in England and Wales. Having had first-hand experience in the courts as a litigant in person, she launched Right2Justice to expose the problems that LIPs face and to propose ways of equalising the playing field.

=== FCO Campaign ===
In December 2016 Lazareff lost her son, Nicolas in Moscow when he was drugged and robbed and dumped in a remote suburb of the city. It was -15° and he died of hypothermia. The Lazareff family claimed they were offered no help form the British Embassy in Moscow or in London in their search for Nicolas.

Lazareff also started a campaign to raise awareness of the importance of the IMEI on mobile devices, both from the point of view of finding people who go missing and wiping out crime associated with the theft of mobile devices.

=== Techpreneurs Awards For Women ===
Lazareff was on the Committee of the University Women's Club, and in March 2014 she launched their Techpreneurs Awards to encourage women to found internet or tech-related start ups, as well as to recognise the work of women who have already made a career in technology. The first groups of awards was in 2014, and subsequent ones in 2015, 2018, and 2019.
