= Edith Daggett Rockwood =

American writer )

Edith Daggett Rockwood (September 2, 1880 – January 3, 1960) was an American writer.

== Early life ==
Rockwood was born in Klamath Falls, Oregon, in 1880, the daughter of Morris Henry and Rose Daggett, descendants of the colonial Putnam family. Morris Henry Daggett was a Klamath Falls pioneer. In 1932 he left Oregon to live with his daughter at Berkeley, California, where he died and is buried. He arrived to Klamath Falls from Redding, California, in 1883. He was born in New York state. He operated a drug store at Fifth and Main Streets, Klamath Falls.

== Career ==
Edith Daggett Rockwood contributed to Arizona newspapers and was a magazine writer.

She is the author of a collection of poems.

While a bookkeeper in the Yuma National bank, she organized the Business and Professional Women's Club in Yuma, Arizona.

She was the organizer of Pioneer's Club of Arizona.

She was a member of Woman's Athletic Club of Alameda County, Oakland, California, National League of American Pen Women.

== Personal life ==
Edith Daggett married George H. Rockwood (1872–1929) and they had two children: George Daggett Rockwood and Hawley McGee.

She lived at 2236 Haste St., Berkeley, California.
