= University Women's Club =

Members club in London, England

Coordinates: 51.5073°N 0.1507°W

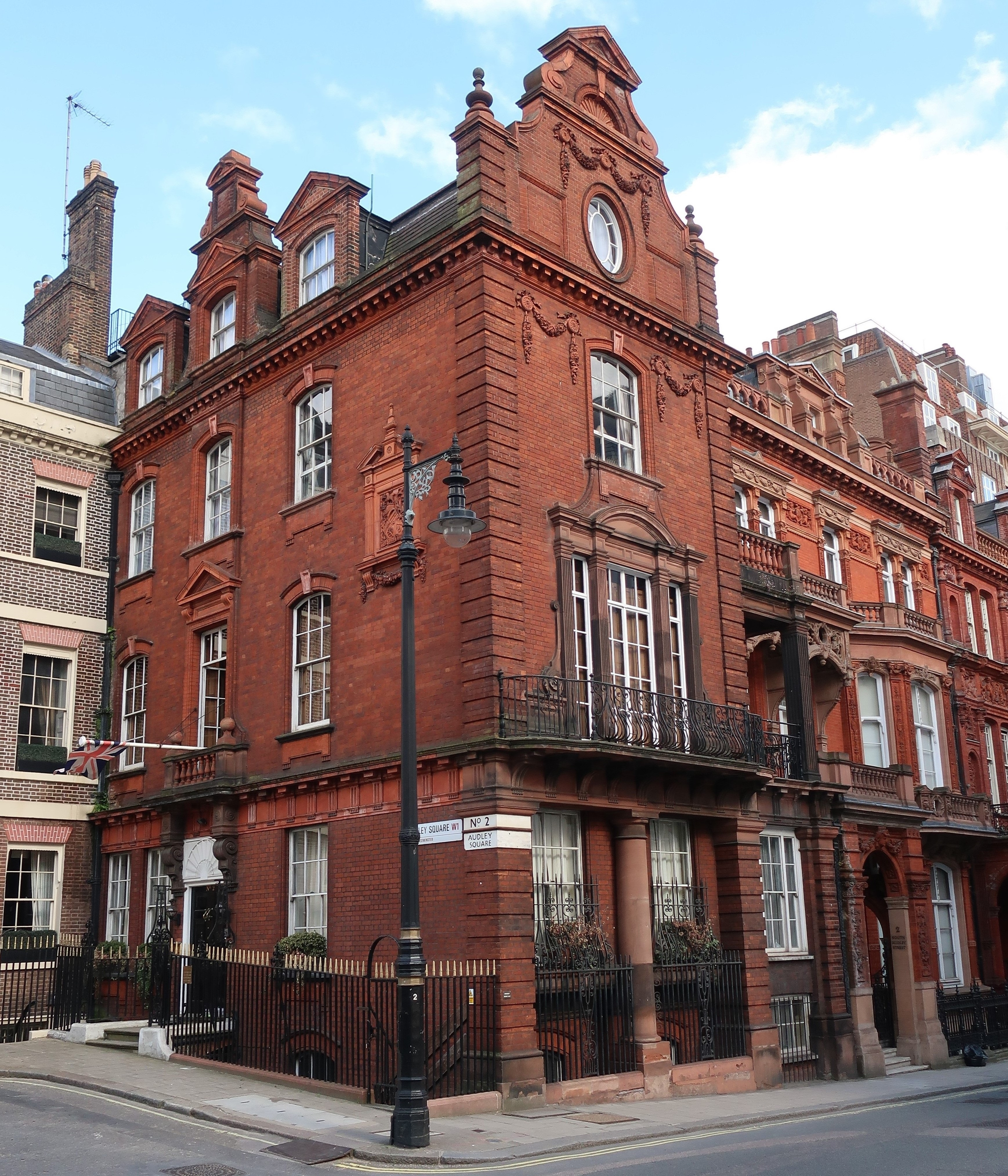
The University Women's Club at 2 Audley Square

The University Women's Club, originally the University Club for Ladies, is a British private members club founded in 1886. As the popular gentlemen's clubs did not accept any women as members, its creation was intended to provide an equivalent club accessible to women. By its own definition, it is a club for "graduate and professional women of varied backgrounds and interests". Members include lawyers, scientists, writers and musicians, as well as businesswomen.

The club house is located at 2 Audley Square, on South Audley Street, Mayfair, London.

== History ==
The first meeting of the founders of the University Women's Club was held in 32 Portland Place at the home of Gertrude Jackson of Girton College, Cambridge on Saturday, 5 May 1883. It was attended by approximately 60 ladies, predominantly from London and Cambridge, and the chair was taken by another Girtonian, Miss Louisa (later Dame Louisa) Lumsden. On 17 July 1886, the membership of the "Association", as it had been called, reached their target number of 200 and the "University Club for Ladies" was officially founded. The members set out to locate a suitable premises and, in January 1887, it opened its doors on the 2nd and 3rd floors at 31 Bond Street.

The primary requirements for admittance to the club were, initially, that applicants were graduates of any University or fully qualified medical practitioners. Considering that there were very few Universities that would admit women to degrees at this time, this was extended to include those with 1 year's residence at Oxford or Cambridge in the women's Halls or Colleges, a degree course at any University followed as far as the first examinations and, for students at the London School of Medicine for Women, a pass in the first professional examination of any Medical Corporation. This, unfortunately, left out the real pioneers who had led the charge to make higher education possible for women but very few of whom had any qualifications. The Club therefore extended an invitation to "ladies who had taken a prominent part in the education of women" to join as "special members", which meant that among the early members were the first principals of nearly all the women's Colleges of Oxford, Cambridge and London. A year later this allowance was amended to "ladies who have distinguished themselves in Art, Science, Literature or Philanthropy, or who have taken a prominent part in the promotion of education". In 1899, a new category of membership, "Associate members", was introduced to extend the requirements beyond strictly academic criteria, leading to the entrance of Henrietta Jex-Blake, niece of the medical pioneer Sophie Jex-Blake. These criteria were later defined as women who "although not academically qualified for election, are, in the opinion of the committee, of equivalent standing" and then further amended to women "whose qualifications are deemed to be of an appropriate nature".

The club's first House Committee, composed of two honorary Officers (Secretary and Treasurer) and 12 members. Their names were:

- Mrs Elizabeth Garrett-Anderson, M.D., London
- Mrs Bryant, London
- Miss J. E. Case, Girton
- Mrs Dowson, London School of Medicine
- Miss MacDonald, London School of Medicine
- Mrs MacLehose, Newnham
- Miss Armstead, Girton
- Miss Benson, L.M.H.
- Mrs Verrall, Newnham
- Miss Welsh, Girton
- Miss F. C. Cobbe, Somerville
- Mrs Nevile Lubbock, Girton
- Hon Secretary: Miss G. E. M. Jackson, Girton – who continued to play a large role in the running of the club, both in a direct then more advisory capacity, until her death in September 1920.
- Hon. Treasurer: Miss Winkworth, Newnham (Mrs Lamb)

The Club remained in Bond Street for some years, but soon enough the rooms became too small to serve the purposes of the club, with Miss Jackson keen that the club also provide bedrooms for its members. Adding to this the plumbing problems of 32 Bond Street the committee began its search for new accommodations, looking first at Princes Street before signing the lease for 47 Maddox Street (with its one bedroom) and moving into the new premises in February 1894.

They remained in Maddox Street for only 5 years, after looking at property in Grosvenor Street and Conduit Street The Club then turned their eyes to George Street, Hanover Square. The club had two successive addresses in George Street, the first at Number 32 which was still too small for their needs and the desire for larger quarters pushed the move to Number 4 in 1904, which had the benefit of more bedrooms and even a Smoking Room, where they remained until 1921. By 1913, membership had grown to 797 members. The club now has almost 1,000 members.

By 1919, the club had grown to the extent that larger premises were again considered. With "young persons of Newnham" looking for rooms to establish their own club and club membership having risen to 900, a meeting was called to discuss another move in the interests of the club, finally settling that when membership reached beyond 950 the matter be reviewed again.

With the growth of the club to 945 members in 1920, new premises came under consideration. 5 Cavendish Square was seriously considered, but whilst members were being consulted the property was purchased for the Spanish Club. Premises in Lower Seymour Street and 13 Great Stanhope Street were also considered. Throughout 1920 a number of further properties were viewed, including some in Portland Place, Cavendish Square, Stratford Place, Upper Berkeley Street, Grosvenor Place and Manchester Square, until, finally, an Extraordinary General Meeting was called by the Committee on 21 April 1921 to approve the purchase of 2 Audley Square, inherited by Flora Russell in 1892 after the death of her father, then ratified in the names of B. A. Clough, H. F. Cohen and A. G. E. Carthew. It was also at this time that the name of the club was changed from the "University Club for Ladies", and so, with the move to Audley Square, the club also became the "University Women's Club".

== 2 Audley Square ==
The house was built by Lord Arthur Russell in about 1880 to house his large family: the architect was T. H. Wyatt. The terrace and garden are now planted with green, white and violet plants, the colours associated with the Suffragette movement. A large London plane tree stands in the middle of the garden, probably originally planted in the grounds of Chesterfield House.

The property was purchased for £22,500, with a £15,000 mortgage to the Misses Russell. Within 2 months a Debenture issue had already raised £14,000 from the members and by 1924 the balance to the Misses Russell had been cleared, with the help of a loan of £10,00 from the Alliance Assurance Company. By 1932, the new mortgage had been paid off, and the club house was declared to be an unencumbered freehold, held in trust for the club, on behalf of the debenture holders.

== The club today ==
Today, the University Women's Club is the only women's club in the UK to be wholly owned and managed by its members.

Its event schedule includes many dinners and other social events.

In March 2014, Fiona Lazareff, a member of the committee, launched the annual Techpreneurs Awards on behalf of the club.

The club has close ties with the East India Club, which occasionally co-organises functions for members of both clubs.

Members pay an initial joining fee and an annual subscription. Fees vary according to location and demographics in order to attract a wide range of members. Referral also plays a part: the club's website states "All prospective members must be proposed and seconded by a member in good standing."

== Notable members ==
- Dorothea Beale (1831–1906)
- Barbara Bodichon (1827–1891)
- Vera Brittain (1893–1970)
- Frances Buss (1827–1894)
- Gail Horton Calmerton (1861–1950)
- Blanche Athena Clough (1861–1960)
- Emily Davies (1830–1921)
- Elizabeth Garrett Anderson (1836–1917)
- Hazel Hunkins Hallinan (1890–1982)
- Henrietta Jex-Blake (1862–1953)
- Louisa Lumsden (1840–1935)
- Dame Bertha Phillpotts (1877–1932)
- Caroline Playne (1857–1948)
- Henrietta Stanley, Baroness Stanley of Alderley (1807–1895)

== See also ==
- List of London's gentlemen's clubs
- East India Club
- Association of London Clubs
