= Adelaide E. Wadsworth =

American painter (1844–1928)

- Born: Adelaide Elizabeth Wadsworth; 1844; Boston, Massachusetts
- Died: 1928 (aged 83–84); Boston, Massachusetts
- Known for: Painting

Adelaide Elizabeth Wadsworth (1844-1928) was an American painter.

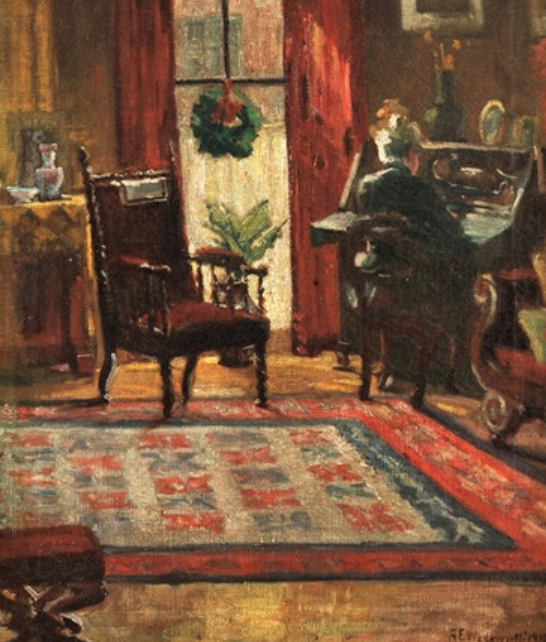
Adelaide E. Wadsworth - Beacon Hill Interior, 1912

== Biography ==
Wadsworth was born in 1844 in Boston, Massachusetts. She studied art with Frank Duveneck, William Morris Hunt, John Henry Twachtman, and Charles Herbert Woodbury.

Wadsworth exhibited her work at the Palace of Fine Arts and the Woman's Building at the 1893 World's Columbian Exposition in Chicago, Illinois. She also exhibited at the Boston Art Club, the Art Institute of Chicago, the Pennsylvania Academy of the Fine Arts, and the National Academy of Design. She was a member of the Society of Independent Artists, and the St. Botolph Club where she also exhibited her painting.

Wadsworth died in 1928 in Boston.
