= Anna Sanborn Hamilton =

American journalist, author, teacher (1848–1927)

Anna Sanborn Hamilton (1848–1927) was an American journalist, author, teacher, principal public schools, proofreader, and clubwoman associated with religious, education, and literary circles. She taught school in New York City and was an active newspaper writer for many years. In Washington, D.C., Hamilton was elected president of Wimodaughsis, an organization having at that time several hundred members, and was later president of the Department of the Potomac Auxiliary to the Grand Army of the Republic, and still later, president of the New York Woman's Club. She was a co-founder and president of the League of American Pen Women.

== Early life and education ==
Anna Sanborn was born in Rochester, New York on December 13, 1848. Her parents were Rodman Wilcox and Elizabeth (Willis) Sanborn. Both sides of her parentage had ancestry from the American Revolution. Anna had six sisters.

She was educated in Rochester, taking a classical academic course. Hamilton graduated from the State Normal School, taking university and Teachers Collegiate courses. She studied several languages.

== Career ==
In her early career, Hamilton taught all grades in a public school, and then served as a principal in a private school.

Hamilton was the author of Art in Textiles. As a journalist, she contributed newsletters to various papers and reported several national conventions, and was a member of the Press Association. She was one of the charter members of the League of American Pen Women. She served as president of the organization in 1911–12, and was also at one time its parliamentarian. It was Hamilton who proposed the formation of the league, which was to be composed of women writers who received payment for their manuscripts. At the time, Hamilton was writing for the New York Tribune, the Syracuse Post, and the Washington Post.

"Clubs are suitable for maiden ladies, widows and married women whose husbands are very much interested in men’s clubs or are otherwise engaged during evening hours." -Anna Sanborn Hamilton, 1912

While living in Denver, Colorado, she was president of the Artemesea Club, composed of men and women for literary and social purposes. She was a member of the Woman's Press Club and the Denver Board of Charities. She served as a deaconess for the Congregational Church.

Since 1897, Hamilton was a resident of Washington, D.C. She was a member of the Monticello chapter of the Daughters of the American Revolution (DAR), where she served as a Regent. She was a representative to the DAR's National Congress. In the Woman's Relief Corps, Grand Army of the Republic, she served as a department president and press chair.

She served as president of the New York State Women's Club of Washington; vice-president of the International Association of Art and Letters; and was also a member and presiding officer of other social and literary clubs, such as the Monday Evening Club, Civics Society, and the General Federation of Women's Clubs. She was a charter member of the City Club of Washington which numbered 2,850 women.

== Personal life ==
In Rochester, she married Major Henry G. Hamilton, of the 140th Regiment, New York Volunteers. They had three children, Ruth (Mrs. Charles A. Chase), John Sanborn and Lewis Carpenter (twins).

In religion, she was a Congregationalist.

Anna Sanborn Hamilton died in Washington, D.C., on April 6, 1927. Burial was in Arlington Cemetery.

== Selected works ==
- Art in Textiles
