= George P. Baker (dean of Harvard Business School) =

American academic administrator

George Pierce Baker (November 1, 1903 – January 25, 1995) was the fifth dean of the Harvard Business School.

Baker earned his bachelor's, master's and Ph.D. all from Harvard University. He began teaching at Harvard in 1928 and joined Harvard Business School faculty in 1936. He left Harvard and joined the Civil Aeronautics Board in 1942. In 1945 he became the director of the Office of Transport and Communications Policy for the United States Department of State. From 1946 to 1956 he served as the United States member of the United Nations Transport and Communications Commission. In 1946 Baker also returned to Harvard Business School as the James J. Hill Professor of Transportation.

His father (whom he is named after) is George Pierce Baker (April 4, 1866 – January 6, 1935) who was a professor of English at Harvard and Yale and author of Dramatic Technique, a codification of the principles of drama.
