= Edith Daley =

American poet (1876–1948)

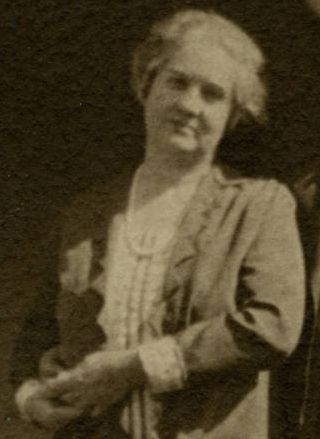
Edith Daley, 1922

Edith Daley (January 1, 1876 - 1948) was the city librarian of San Jose, California and poet whose writings are in various anthologies.

== Early life ==
Edith Daley was born in Fostoria, Ohio, on January 1, 1876.

== Career ==
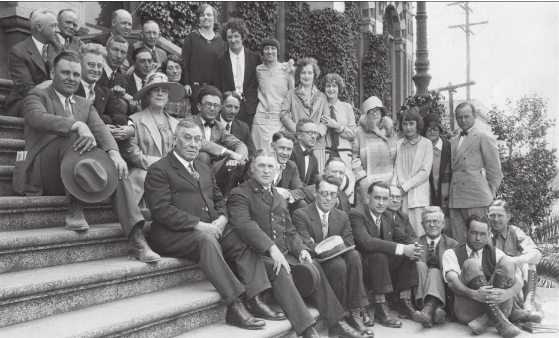
Edith Daley, rear 4th from the right, top left Clarence Goodwin, far right police judge Percy O'Connor

Edith Daley was the city librarian of San Jose. She was the author of "War History of Santa Clara County", retelling life in San Jose during World War I. She was the author of "Angel in the Sun" (1917), a book of verse, reviewed in the Evening News in December 1917, "Silver Twilight", "The Golden Dome" and of poems contained in the following anthologies: "Roosevelt as the Poets Saw Him", Markham's anthology of "World's Best Poetry", Stidger's "Flames of Faith", "A Day in the Hills", "A Day of Poetry".

She was a columnist and writer for the San Jose Evening News where she wrote colorful and in-depth articles on local industries.

She was the president of San Jose Poetry Club. She was friends with Henry Mead Bland, a philosopher and teacher, and Edwin Markham, a poet. They were called "The Three Poets". Bland wrote the foreword for Daley's book "The Angel in the Sun".

She was a member of the Order of the Eastern Star, California Writer's, National League of American Pen Women, Woman's Club.

In 1924 she was suspended from her position as city librarian for "insubordination and conduct unbecoming a librarian". The action was taken by the President of the Board of Library Trustees apparently for two reason: firstly Daley refused to remove from the library several books by Albert Bushnell Hart, considered unpatriotic and pro-British, and secondly she took part in a political campaign, supporting A.L. Hubbard in his campaign for Supervisor against Victor Challen.

In 1928 she introduced the Newark Card System and an increasing fine system at the San Jose Library.

== Personal life ==
Edith Daley moved to California in 1906 and lived at 633 Palm Haven Ave., San Jose, California. She married Frederick Hammond Daley (died 1938), cost-accountant of the Richmond-Chase Canning Company.

In 1922 she was given the custody of 14 years old Irene Grandstedt, who had been charged with assault with a deadly weapon on Harold Galloway, supposedly her lover.

In 1943 she retired due to ill health and her position was taken over by Geraldine Nurney, who had been the children's librarian at San Jose for 10 years.

She died in 1948.
