= Solano County Library =

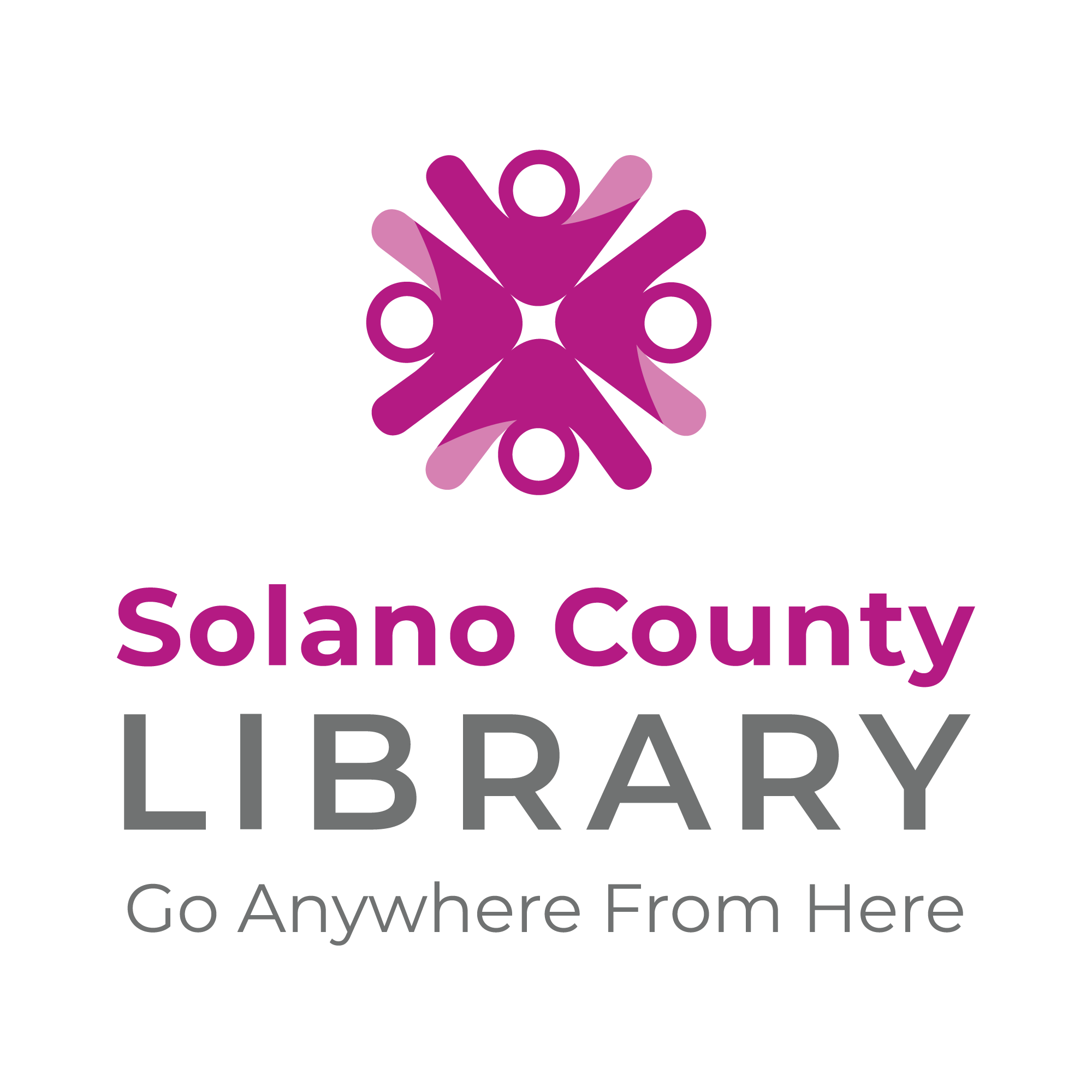
- 38.252°N 122.047°W
- Location: Solano County, California, United States
- Type: Public library
- Established: 1914; 111 years ago
- Service area: Dixon; Fairfield; Rio Vista; Suisun City; Vacaville; Vallejo; Unincorporated Solano County
- Branches: 9

Access and use
- Population served: 424,233 (2014)

Other information
- Budget: $33,948,664 (2016)
- Director: Suzanne Olawski
- Website: solanolibrary.com

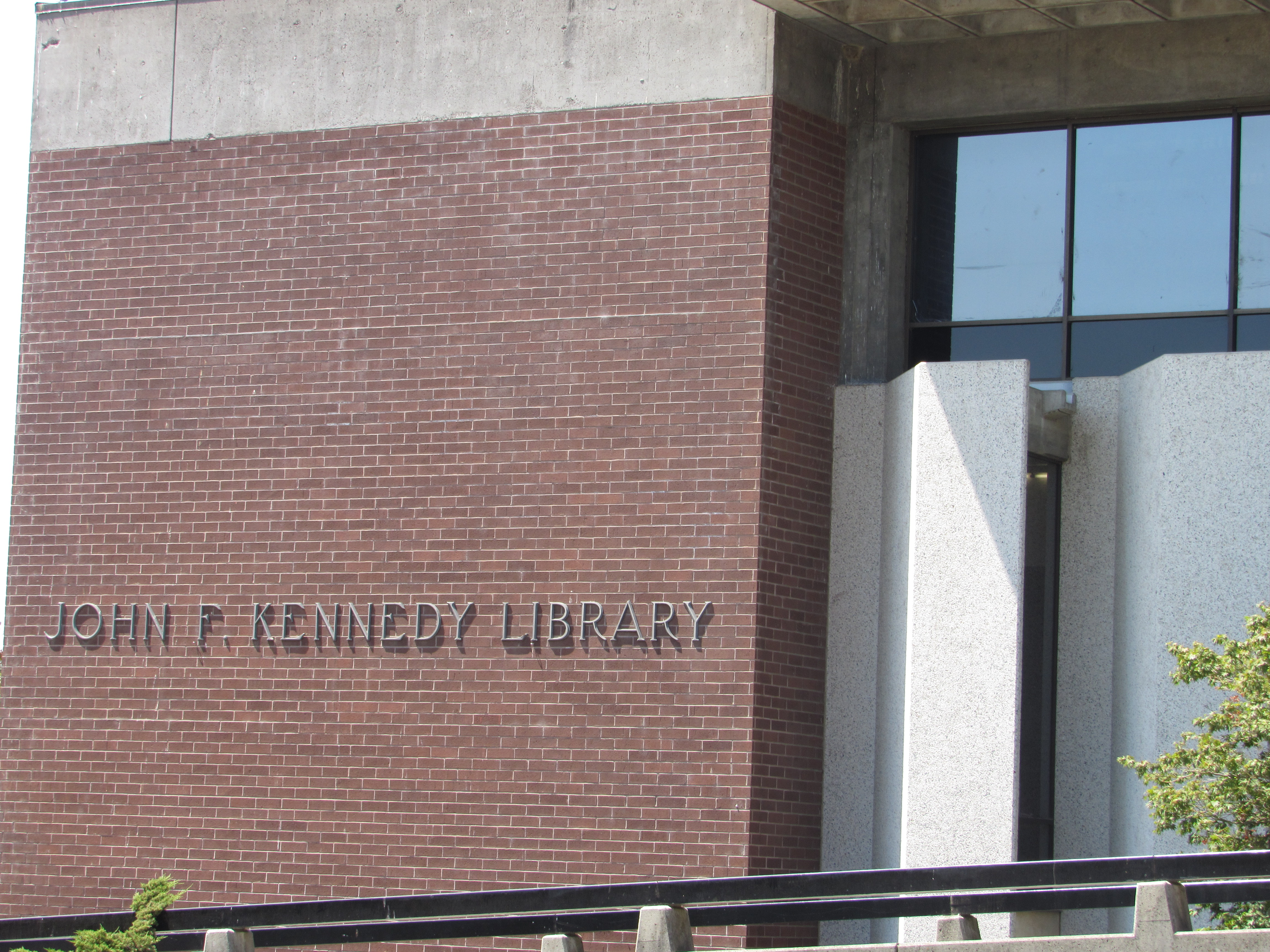
John F. Kennedy Library in Vallejo is a branch of the Solano County Library.

Solano County Library is the public library for Solano County, California, United States, including the cities of Dixon, Fairfield, Rio Vista, Suisun City, Vacaville, and Vallejo. The library consists of nine branch locations, the Solano County Law Library, and the Solano County Library Adult Literacy Program. The city of Benicia operates its own independent public library. It is a partner of the Solano Partner Libraries & St. Helena (SPLASH) Consortium.

Solano County Library offers library materials, resources, information, entertainment and lifelong learning opportunities for the people of Solano County.

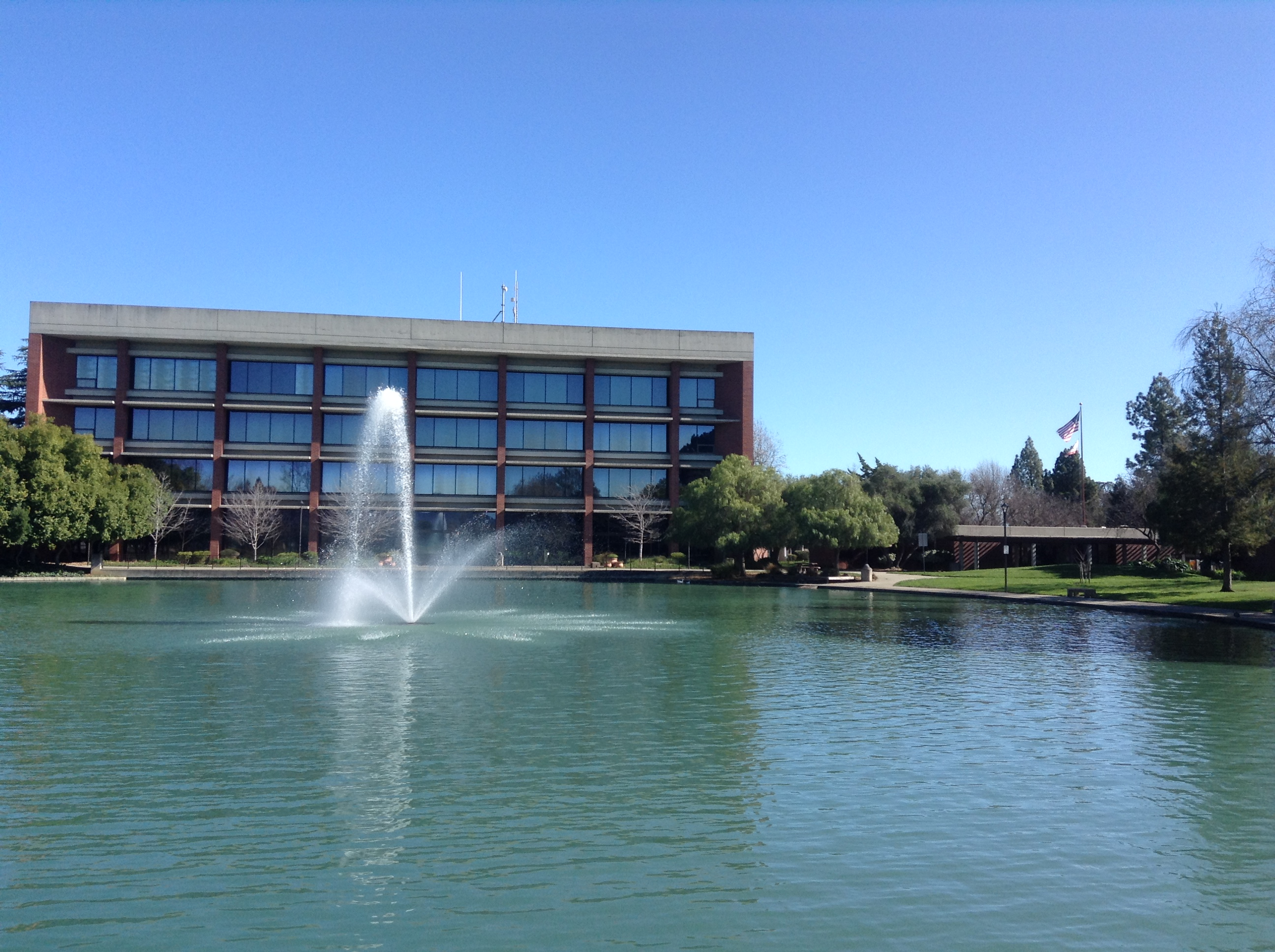
The Solano County Library in Fairfield

== History ==
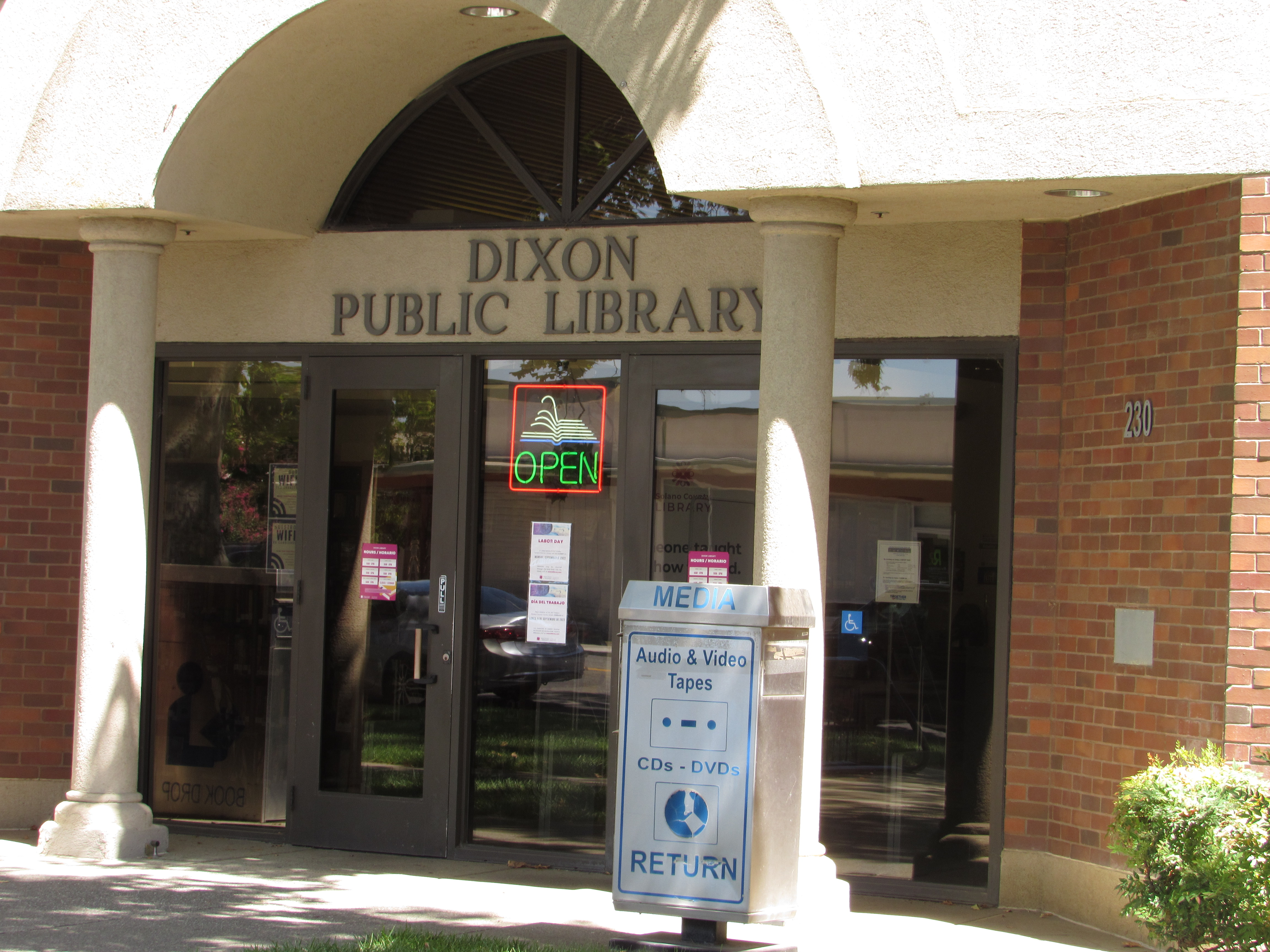
Dixon Public Library

The Solano County Library was established in 1914 by the county's board of supervisors. For its first two decades of service the library collection was kept in various locations until a permanent building was constructed for library use in 1931.
