= Julia Riew =

American composer-lyricist and songwriter

- Education: Harvard University
- Years active: 2018-present

Julia Riew is an American composer-lyricist, librettist, songwriter, and novelist.

== Early life and education ==
Riew is a third generation Korean-American who grew up in St. Louis, Missouri. She was involved with music from a young age, starting violin lessons at age 4. She began writing music at age 7, and had written a musical of her own by age 15. While in school, she was a member of the St. Louis Children's Choirs and the Arch City Kids Theater Troupe, which put on cabarets to raise money for juvenile diabetes. Her family later moved to New York City and then Connecticut.

She attended Harvard University. Although initially in a pre-med program, she graduated in May 2022 with a concentration in Theater, Dance, and Media and Music. While there, she was a founding member of the Asian Students Arts Project.

== Musical theater ==
=== College work ===
Riew wrote her first college musical, Hitched, in 2018. In April 2019, East Side, a student-produced musical Riew co-wrote about a Chinese-American family dealing with gentrification in New York City, premiered at Harvard's Farkas Hall. After seeing the show, the American Repertory Theater (ART) commissioned Riew to write two family oriented shows: Thumbelina: A Little Musical, which premiered in December 2019 at the Loeb Center, and Jack and the Beanstalk: A Musical Adventure. In June 2022 she premiered Alice's Wonderland at the Coterie Theater in Kansas City, Missouri, a show she co-wrote with J. Quinton Johnson.

=== Dive ===
For her senior thesis, Riew began developing a musical inspired by the Korean folktale Shimcheong and her own experiences with Korean-American identity. In January 2022 she shared some of her music on TikTok, where as of August 2024 she had a following of 135,000 users and 3.5 million likes. Shimcheong: A Folktale was later renamed to Dive. Riew put on her thesis in February and March 2022 on Harvard's campus. In February 2023 Riew performed several of her songs as part of Playbill's Songwriter Series.

In April 2023 ART announced they would further develop Dive with the help of Riew, Diana Son, and Diane Paulus.

=== Upcoming projects ===
Other upcoming projects include her musical ENDLESS (dir. by Zi Alikhan, premiering in Korea).

== Writing ==
In July 2025, Riew published the YA fantasy novel The Last Tiger, which was co-written with her brother, Brad Riew. The novel was inspired by the story of their grandparents' romance in Japanese-occupied Korea. The novel entered The New York Times Best Seller list at number five.

She released Shim Jung Takes the Dive on 28 April 2026 on HarperCollins which is a Middle Grade fantasy novel that on pre-release was earlier titled as Shimcheong.

== Awards ==
- 2022 Fred Ebb Award
