= The Founders of the Daughters of the American Revolution =

Sculpture in Washington, United States

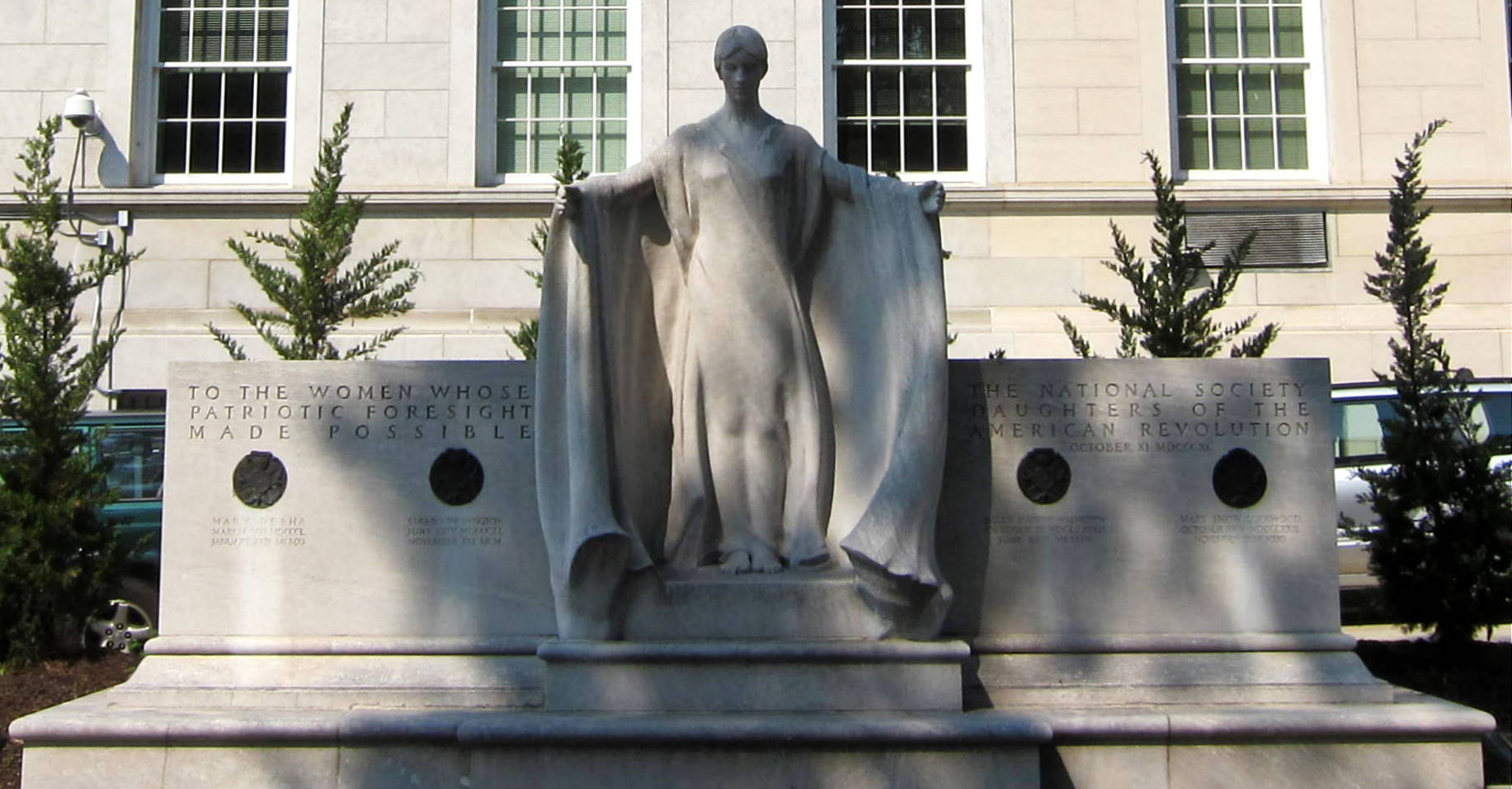
- Interactive map of The Founders of the Daughters of the American Revolution
- Location: 1700 block of C Street NW; Washington, D.C., United States
- Coordinates: 38.8936896°N 77.0402438°W
- Designer: Gertrude Vanderbilt Whitney
- Material: Marble
- Length: 18.0 feet (5.5 m)
- Width: 5.5 feet (1.7 m)
- Height: 9.0 feet (2.7 m)
- Opening date: April 17, 1929
- Dedicated to: Mary Desha; Mary Smith Lockwood; Ellen Hardin Walworth; Eugenia Washington

The Founders of the Daughters of the American Revolution is a sculpture located beside Constitution Hall in Washington, D.C., United States. Dedicated in 1929, during the administration of President General Grace Lincoln Hall Brosseau, the sculpture was created by artist and socialite Gertrude Vanderbilt Whitney in honor of the four founders of the Daughters of the American Revolution (DAR): Mary Desha, Mary Smith Lockwood, Ellen Hardin Walworth, and Eugenia Washington. The sculpture is one of three outdoor artworks in Washington, D.C. by Whitney, the other two being the Titanic Memorial and the Aztec Fountain at the Pan American Union Building.

== Design ==
The marble sculpture is a female figure symbolizing American womanhood. She has outstretched arms and is adorned with flowing drapery. Four medallions honoring the four founders of the DAR are on the front of a rectangular marble stele that stands behind the sculpture.

The inscriptions on the memorial include the following:

- Gertrude V. Whitney
- TO THE WOMEN WHOSE/PATRIOTIC FORESIGHT/MADE POSSIBLE/THE NATIONAL SOCIETY/DAUGHTERS OF THE/AMERICAN REVOLUTION/OCTOBER X1 MDCCCXC (front of exedra base)
- MARY DESHA/MARCH VIII MDCCCL/JANUARY XXIX MCMXI, EUGENIA WASHINGTON/JUNE XXIV MDCCCXL/NOVEMBER XXX MCM, ELLEN HARDIN WALWORTH/OCTOBER XX MDCCCXXXII/JUNE XXIII MCMXV, MARY SMITH LOCKWOOD/OCTOBER XXIV MDCCCXXXI/NOVEMBER IX MCMXXII (under medallions)

== See also ==
- List of public art in Washington, D.C., Ward 2
- Outdoor sculpture in Washington, D.C.
