= DAR Hospital Corps =

American nursing organization

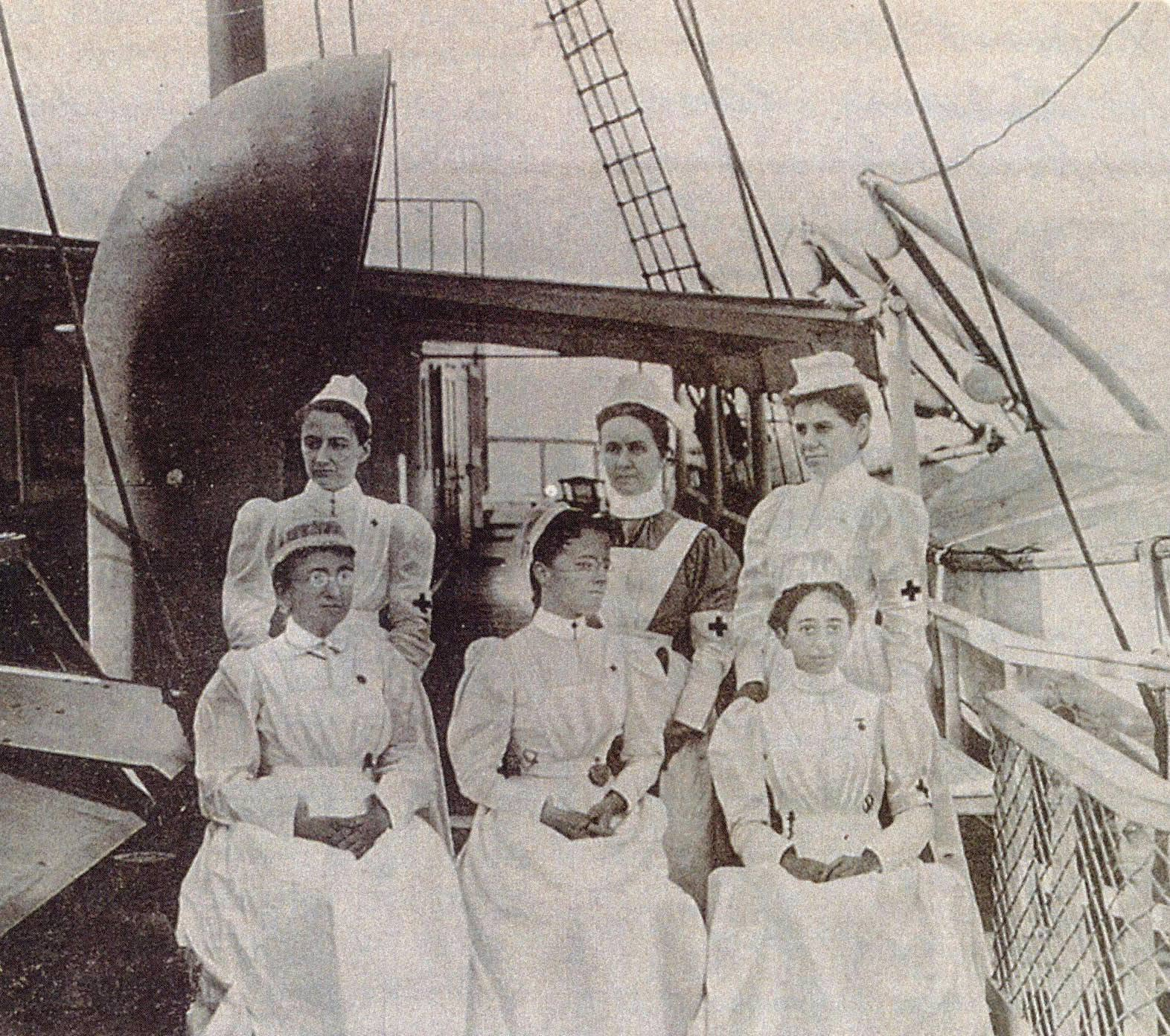
- Active: 1898
- Country: United States
- Branch: United States Army; United States Navy

The Daughters of the American Revolution Hospital Corps (DARHC), simply known as DAR Hospital Corps was an American nursing organization established by the Daughters of the American Revolution, under the direction of Anita Newcomb McGee, to train military nurses during the Spanish–American War. They certified 1,081 trained nurses for service during the war. The Corps was the precursor to the United States Army Nurse Corps and the United States Navy Nurse Corps.

== History ==
As the United States Armed Forces did not have an affiliated nursing group to treat servicemen during wartime in the 19th century, the United States Army appointed physician and Daughters of the American Revolution officer Anita Newcomb McGee as Acting Assistant Surgeon. Prior to this, military nurses had been almost dormant since the Civil War.

On April 28, 1898, Surgeon General George M. Sternberg requested permission from Secretary of War Russell A. Alger to hire an unlimited number of nurses under contract but without military status. Sternberg then tasked McGee with selecting educated and experienced nurses to work for the Army and the Navy during the Spanish–American War. She founded the DAR Hospital Corps in 1898 to vet applicants for military nursing positions. Some nurses registered through the Corps were trained by the American Red Cross while many others came from Catholic religious orders including the Sisters of Charity, the Sisters of Mercy, and the Sisters of the Holy Cross. McGee appointed Mary Desha as Assistant Director of the DAR Hospital Corps, and with their volunteer staff, they examined between 5,000 and 8,000 applications from their Washington, D.C. office. They judged applicants on their professional ability, character, and health, preferring them to have already survived yellow fever as that made them resistant to it in the war camps.

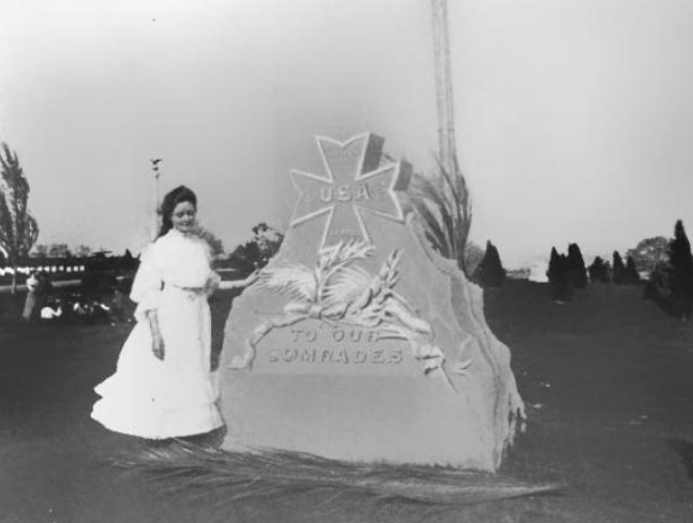
Anita Newcomb McGee's daughter, Klotho McGee, standing next to the Spanish–American War Nurses Memorial after its unveiling in May 1905.

The Corps registered 1,081 trained nurses for service. The Army surgeon general required that nurses be between the ages of 30 and 50 but the age minimum was later waved. The nurses wore white dresses, caps, and aprons and a badge in the form of a red cross of enamel, engraved with the words "Hospital Corps", surrounded by a blue enamel circle, engraved with the words "Daughters of the American Revolution". Each apron had the DAR insignia stenciled onto it.

Throughout the war, DAR Hospital Corps nurses served in the United States, Cuba, and the Philippines. Four Catholic Lakota nuns were registered by the Corps as nurses to be sent to Camp Cuba Libre, before being assigned to Camp Columbia in Havana.

Those serving the Navy were not promised pay but did receive reimbursements for travel expenses and were ultimately paid $30 a month with ration allowances provided by private funds, not the federal government. The Daughters of the American Revolution later funded pensions for many of the nurses who did not qualify for government pensions.

On September 7, 1898, the Daughters of the American Revolution were relieved from further nursing registration duty in connection with the United States Army and Navy. The Corps led to the eventual establishment of the United States Army Nurse Corps in 1901 and the United States Navy Nurse Corps in 1908.

== Notable members ==
- Mary Desha
- Clara Maass
- Anita Newcomb McGee
- Ellen Hardin Walworth
- Ruby Walworth
