= George Steptoe Washington =

American militia officer (1771–1809)

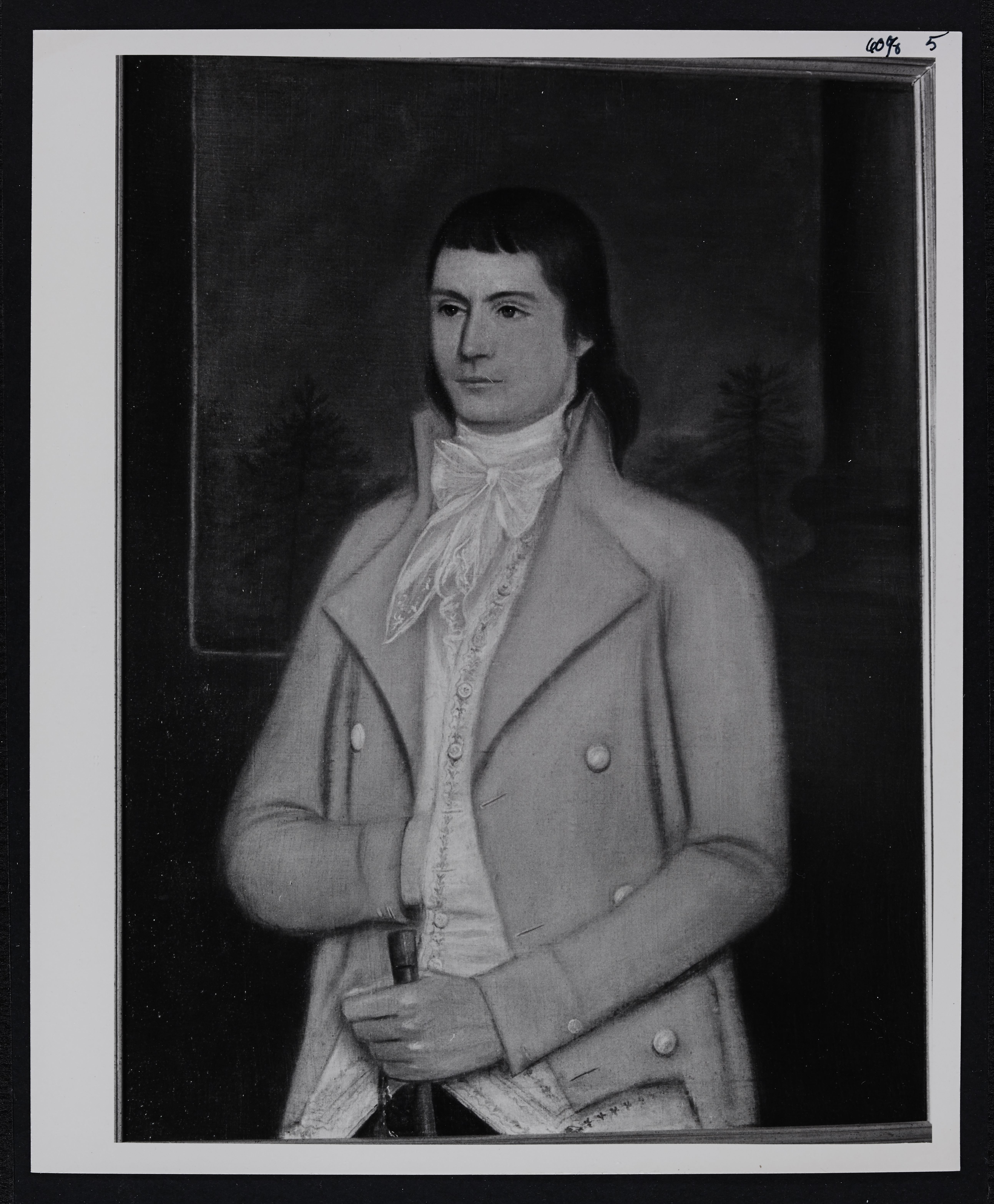
- Born: August 17, 1771; Harewood, Berkeley County, Virginia, British America
- Died: January 10, 1809 (aged 37); Augusta, Georgia, U.S.
- Occupations: Planter, Militia officer
- Spouse: Lucy Washington (m. 1793)
- Children: 4
- Parent(s): Samuel Washington; Anne Steptoe
- Relatives: Washington family

George Steptoe Washington (August 17, 1771 – January 10, 1809) was an American planter and militia officer. He was a nephew of the first President of the United States George Washington, and one of the late President's seven executors. He was the grandfather of Eugenia Scholay Washington (1838–1900) who founded the lineage societies Daughters of the American Revolution and Daughters of the Founders and Patriots of America. He died at the age of 37 of tuberculosis.

== Early life and education ==
George Steptoe Washington was born August 17, 1771, at Harewood, his father's plantation in Berkeley County, Virginia (now Jefferson County in West Virginia). He was the fourth of seven children (but the eldest surviving son) born to Samuel Washington and his fourth wife, Anne Steptoe, and like his father, would ultimately die young of tuberculosis.

George Steptoe Washington was named for his uncle, President George Washington, while his middle name reflected his maternal heritage. The family also included four brothers and two sisters (as well as several half-brothers and sisters): Ferdinand Washington (1767–1788), Frederick Augustus Washington (1768–1769), Lucinda Washington (1769–1770), Lawrence Augustine Washington (1774–1824), Harriet Washington (1776–1822), and Thomas Washington (1778–1838).

After their father's death, he and brother Lawrence Augustine and sister Harriet, went to live with their uncle George Washington. The future president paid for him and his brother to be educated at Georgetown academy, According to historian Ron Chernow, "they were wild and uncontrollable and a constant trial to Washington".

G.S. Washington studied law in Philadelphia with Edmund Randolph, and later briefly served as his uncle's secretary. who sent letters of encouragement and, occasionally of reproof.

== Marriage and family life ==
While in Philadelphia in 1793, George, who was twenty-two years of age, eloped with Lucy Anne Payne (1769–1846), a sister of future First Lady Dolley Madison. Lucy was only fifteen, and a member of the Society of Friends, who disowned her because of her marriage. The families reconciled, and later Lucy's mother Mary Coles Payne would bring the younger Payne children to Harewood to live with the Washingtons. The parlor of Harewood was the site of the marriage of James Madison and Dolley Payne Todd in 1794. Together, George and Lucy had four children:

- George Steptoe Washington (1796–1796), who died in infancy.
- Samuel Walter Washington (1797–1831), a medical doctor who married Louisa Clemson (b. 1805) and had three daughters.
- William Temple Washington (1800–1877), who married Margaret Calhoun Fletcher (1805–1865) and had issue.
- George Steptoe Washington Jr. (1806–1831), who married Gabriella Augusta Hawkins but had no children.

== Career ==
Although not yet of legal age when his father died in 1781, George inherited Harewood plantation, as well as other properties in what became West Virginia long after his death.

This Washington was also one of the seven executors responsible for executing his late uncle's last will and testament. Although the active executors were his cousins Bushrod Washington (son of John Augustine Washington, whose legal education General George Washington also helped pay for and who become the named heir to Mount Vernon plantation) and the late President's former secretary (and husband of his step-daughter Nellie Park Custis), Lawrence Lewis, George Steptoe Washington was also a named executor and received one of the late general's swords. The other executors were Martha Washington, William Augustine Washington (son of Augustine Washington Jr.), Samuel Washington (son of Charles Washington) and Nellie's brother George Washington Parke Custis (when he reached legal age).

G.S. Washington operated of his Harewood plantation using enslaved labor. He also bought and sold a number of parcels of land in Virginia and elsewhere. He also served as an officer of the local militia, albeit with the rank of Major (whereas other cousins were captains or colonels of their county militias).

== Death and legacy ==
On January 10, 1809, George Steptoe Washington died of consumption at the age of thirty-seven in Augusta, Georgia, where he had gone to establish another plantation.

His widow subsequently married Judge Thomas Todd, who was an Associate Justice of the U.S. Supreme Court. Their wedding was the first ever to be held in the White House. While Judge Todd died in 1826, Lucy died at the age of 74 in 1846.

While Harewood exists today, in 1875, after the American Civil War, it was acquired by Richard Blackburn Washington (who traced his descent through John Augustine Washington rather than Samuel Washington), who had inherited the nearby Blakeley plantation, which he sold and moved to Harewood.

=== Descendants ===
Through his son Samuel, he was the grandfather of Lucy Elizabeth Washington (b. 1823), who married John Bainbridge Packett (1817–1872) and had issue; Christian Maria Washington (1826–1895), who married Richard Blackburn Washington (1822–1910), a relative of hers and had issue; Annie S.C. Washington (1831–1911), who married Thomas Augustus Brown and had issue including Forrest Washington Brown (1855–1934), who married Emma Beverly Tucker.

Through his son William, George Steptoe Washington was the grandfather of Jane Washington (b. 1834), who married Thomas Gascoigne Moncure (1837–1906) and had no issue; Lucy Washington (1822–1825), who died young; Millissent Fowler Washington (1824–1893), who married Robert Grier McPherson (1819–1899) and had issue; William Temple Washington Jr. (b. 1827); Thomas West Washington (1829–1868); Eugenia Scholay Washington (1838–1900), a founder of the lineage societies, Daughters of the American Revolution and Daughters of the Founders and Patriots of America; and Ferdinand Steptoe Washington (1843–1912).
