= Eugenia Washington =

American historian (1838–1900)

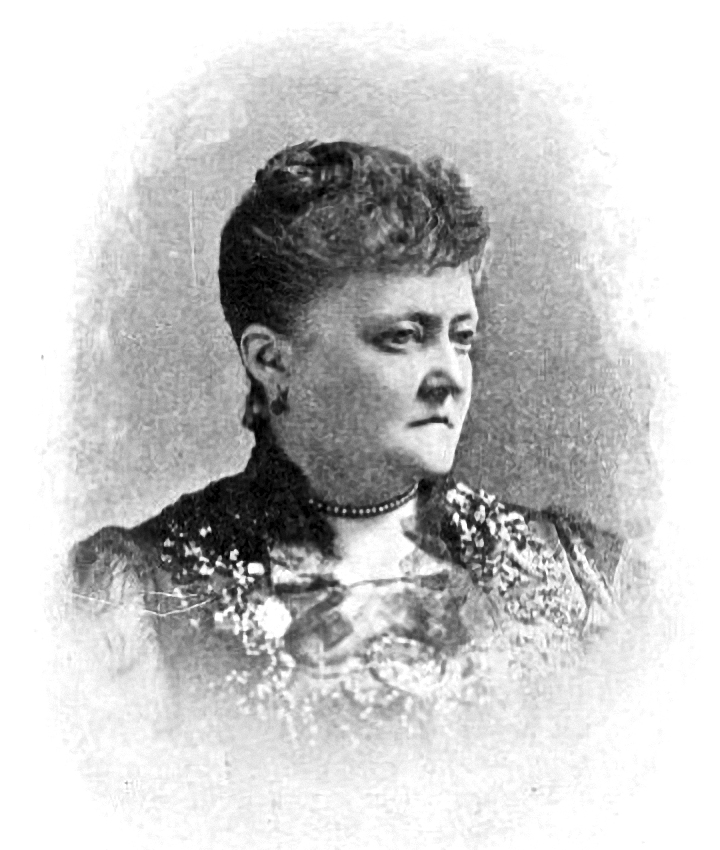
- Born: June 27, 1838 "Megwillie", near Charles Town, Virginia, US
- Died: November 30, 1900 (aged 62); Washington, DC, US
- Resting place: "Glencairne", Falmouth, Virginia
- Occupations: Historian and civil servant
- Employer: United States Post Office Department
- Known for: Co-founding the Daughters of the American Revolution and founding the Daughters of the Founders and Patriots of America
- Relatives: Samuel Washington (great-grandfather); George Washington (great-great-uncle); George Steptoe Washington (grandfather); Dolley Payne Todd Madison (great-aunt); John C. Calhoun (great-great-uncle); Thomas Fletcher (grandfather)

Eugenia Scholay Washington (June 27, 1838 – November 30, 1900) was an American historian and civil servant. She is known for co-founding the Daughters of the American Revolution and founding the Daughters of the Founders and Patriots of America.

Washington was born in 1838 near Charles Town, Virginia, in present-day West Virginia. She was the daughter of William Temple Washington, through whom she was a great-grandniece of George Washington, first president of the United States, and a grandniece of Dolley Payne Todd Madison. Following her family's relocation to Stafford County, she and her family witnessed the Battle of Fredericksburg first hand during the American Civil War.

Due to her family's limited financial resources after the war and her father's illness, Washington accepted a position as a clerk within the United States Post Office Department in Washington, DC, to support her family. There, Washington was one of the four co-founders of the National Society of the Daughters of the American Revolution (with Mary Desha, Mary Smith Lockwood, and Ellen Hardin Walworth). Washington had reportedly been inspired by her experiences during the American Civil War to found an organization for preserving the shared heritage of women from the North and South of the United States. Washington was the DAR's first Registrar General, and was made "number one" on the "grand roll" of the society's membership. In 1898, Washington founded another lineage society, the National Society of Daughters of the Founders and Patriots of America, with the broader goal of preserving the history of the American colonial era.

While visiting a relative in Louisiana around 1870, Washington attended a Roman Catholic mission. She later converted to Roman Catholicism from her Episcopal faith, after which she became a prominent lecturer of the Catholic faith. Washington never married, and she died in 1900. Washington was interred beside her mother at the Moncure family burial ground of her sister's estate, "Glencairne", in Falmouth, Virginia.

== Early life, family, and ancestry ==
Eugenia Scholay Washington was born on June 27, 1838, at "Megwillie" plantation near Charles Town in Jefferson County, Virginia (now West Virginia), to William Temple Washington (1800–1877) and his wife, Margaret Calhoun Fletcher (1805–1865). The name of the plantation on which she was born, "Megwillie", was a portmanteau of both her mother and father's nicknames.

Through her father, Washington was the granddaughter of George Steptoe Washington (1771–1809) and Lucy Payne Washington Todd (1772?–1846). She was also the great-granddaughter of Samuel Washington (1734–1781, younger brother of George Washington) and his wife Annie Steptoe, and the great-grandniece of George Washington (1732–1799). Her grandfather, George Steptoe Washington, was a "favorite nephew" of George Washington and was left an inheritance following Washington's death. Washington's grandmother, Lucy Payne Washington Todd, was a sister of First Lady of the United States Dolley Payne Todd Madison (1768–1849). The widowed Dolley Payne Todd married James Madison at Washington's grandparents' residence, Harewood.

Through her mother, Washington was great-grandniece of John C. Calhoun (1782–1850). Also through her mother, Washington was descended from Charles Francois Joseph, Count de Flechir (born in France in 1755, died in New York in 1815), who served in the American Revolutionary War and was "a friend and kinsman" of Gilbert du Motier, Marquis de Lafayette. Count de Flechir married Ruth Phillips Sourency. Flechir's grandson and Washington's grandfather, Thomas Fletcher, served on the staff of General William Henry Harrison in the War of 1812. Thomas Fletcher married Nancy McIlhenney and was the son of Samuel Fletcher and Abigail West.

Washington's father, William Temple Washington, was educated at the College of William & Mary and home schooled his children. Around 1859, William Washington relocated his family to a plantation at Falmouth in Stafford County, Virginia, located on the north side of the Rappahannock River across from Fredericksburg. Washington's father suffered from paralysis, and she cared for him from a young age.

== American Civil War ==
Following her family's relocation to Falmouth, Washington continued to live a "tranquil life" caring for her father until the American Civil War. Union and Confederate forces fought near the family plantation, so Washington and her family "suffered all the horrors and the hardships" of the war. The family witnessed the Battle of Fredericksburg, December 11–15, 1862, first hand. A wounded Union Army officer was brought to their home early in the battle and placed in Washington's care while waiting a surgeon, thus delaying the evacuation of Washington and her disabled father. As the battle drew even nearer, Washington "sheltered her father's body with her own" in a trench created by a cannon, and they remained in that position for an entire day.

By the end of the American Civil War, Washington and her family were "deprived of all worldly goods". Washington's mother, Margaret, died shortly after the war's conclusion in 1865, and her father, William Temple, died twelve years later in 1877.

== United States Post Office Department ==
After her mother's death, Washington accepted a position as a clerk within the United States Post Office Department in Washington, DC, to support herself and her ailing father. Eva Bryan, former president of the Daughters of Founders and Patriots of America, considered Washington's position an "honorable" one for a woman, because of the family's financial straits, although otherwise "the great-great-niece of George Washington would not normally be employed". Washington and her father relocated from Falmouth to Washington in 1867, and she lived there until her death in 1900. During her tenure with the Post Office, Washington was known as "Miss Eugie" and "considered quite attractive and always received a great deal of attention wherever she went". During her last decade, Washington served as a clerk in the Dead letter office.

== Daughters of the American Revolution ==
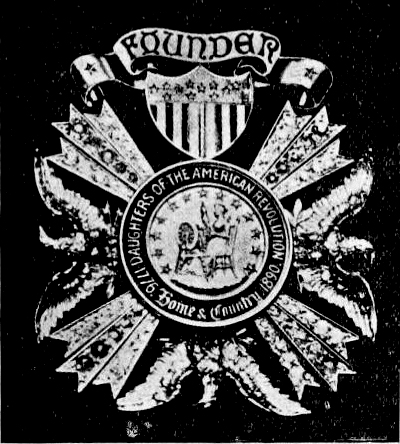
Jeweled badge awarded to Washington by the National Society of the Daughters of the American Revolution

Washington was one of the four co-founders of the National Society of the Daughters of the American Revolution (with Mary Desha, Mary Smith Lockwood, and Ellen Hardin Walworth). The organization's founders emulated the Sons of the American Revolution, founded in New York City on April 30, 1889, which excluded women. According to society tradition, Washington's experiences during the American Civil War "inspired in her a will to assist women from both the North and the South in the worthy cause of preserving their shared heritage".

Washington and Desha consulted regularly with Sons of the American Revolution members for advice, particularly Registrar General Dr. George Brown Goode, Secretary General A. Howard Clark, William O. McDowell (SAR member #1), and Wilson L. Gill (secretary at the inaugural meeting). On October 11, 1890, at 2 pm, the 18 founding members and these four men met at the Stratford Arms in Washington, DC, thus forming the Daughters of the American Revolution. Washington, Desha, Lockwood, and Walworth are called co-founders since they held two to three meetings in August 1890.

Washington was the DAR's first Registrar General, and her name appears as member "number one" on the "grand roll" of membership. Washington also served as secretary general, vice president general, and in 1895 she became honorary vice president general, an office which she held until her death. Under Washington's leadership, the society raised funds for a national monument to Mary Ball Washington, mother of George Washington. Washington ardently carried out the duties of her offices at DAR, despite suffering with a serious eye condition that made it difficult for her to write. Washington stated, "We want a patriotic society founded on service and I will not become a member of an organization which is founded on rank and not on the service of the ancestors."

== Daughters of Founders and Patriots of America ==
Washington founded another lineage society, the National Society of Daughters of the Founders and Patriots of America, in June 1898. Washington established this organization with the broader goals of preserving the history of the American colonial era (like The Colonial Dames of America and the National Society of Colonial Dames of America), as well as encouraging appreciation of American history and fostering patriotism. Washington disliked the "bickering" within the DAR, and to ensure a more "congenial" society that "remained small and cordial", she required that the new organization members also be direct descendants of "a colonist who arrived in America between May 13, 1607 and May 13, 1687" as well as qualify for the DAR. Washington chose the deadline date of May 13, 1687 (broader than the Mayflower Society), so that she would be eligible for membership in the society. While Washington intended for the organization not to grow beyond 300 members, membership in the Daughters of Founders and Patriots of America grew to 2,800 by the mid-1980s.

== Catholic faith ==
While visiting a family member in Louisiana around 1870, Washington attended a Catholic mission organized by the Paulists at a neighboring parish. After "careful study", Washington was received into the Roman Catholic Church. Prior to her conversion, Washington consulted with a clergyman at her Episcopal church, and in response to his concern, she replied: "Oh no, I must act up to my convictions and I shall pray hard that you may be given the same grace." Washington became a prominent lecturer of the Catholic faith and attended the Cathedral of St. Matthew the Apostle in Washington, DC.

== Later life and death ==
Washington never married. In 1892, Washington purchased a second residence at 5706 Berwyn Road in Berwyn Heights, Maryland, from James E. Waugh; she owned it until her death. While in Washington, DC, she resided with her cousin Fanny Washington Finch at 813 13th Street, Northwest. Washington died at the age of 62 on Friday, November 30, 1900, at her home on 13th Street. Washington's housemate and cousin Fanny Washington Finch predeceased her in March of that year. Only "a few acquaintances" among Washington's colleagues and employees in her Post Office bureau knew she was ill, and she worked until a week before her death.

Washington's sister, Jean Washington Moncure, also a resident of Washington and married to Thomas Gascoigne Moncure, arranged for Washington's funeral at her own house and interment next to their mother at the Moncure estate "Glencairne" on the Rappahannock River near Falmouth. On December 1, 1900, the funeral train left the Pennsylvania Railroad station in Washington, DC, for Fredericksburg, Virginia. The Fredericksburg Betty Lewis Chapter of the Daughters of the American Revolution "escorted" Washington's remains. A simple graveside service was performed by Reverend Dr. Smith, pastor of St. George's Episcopal Church in Fredericksburg. A memorial service and requiem mass for Washington were held at St. Patrick's Catholic Church in Washington, DC, on December 31, 1900. Following Washington's death, her sister Jean was the last surviving patrilineal descendant of William Temple Washington.

== Legacy ==
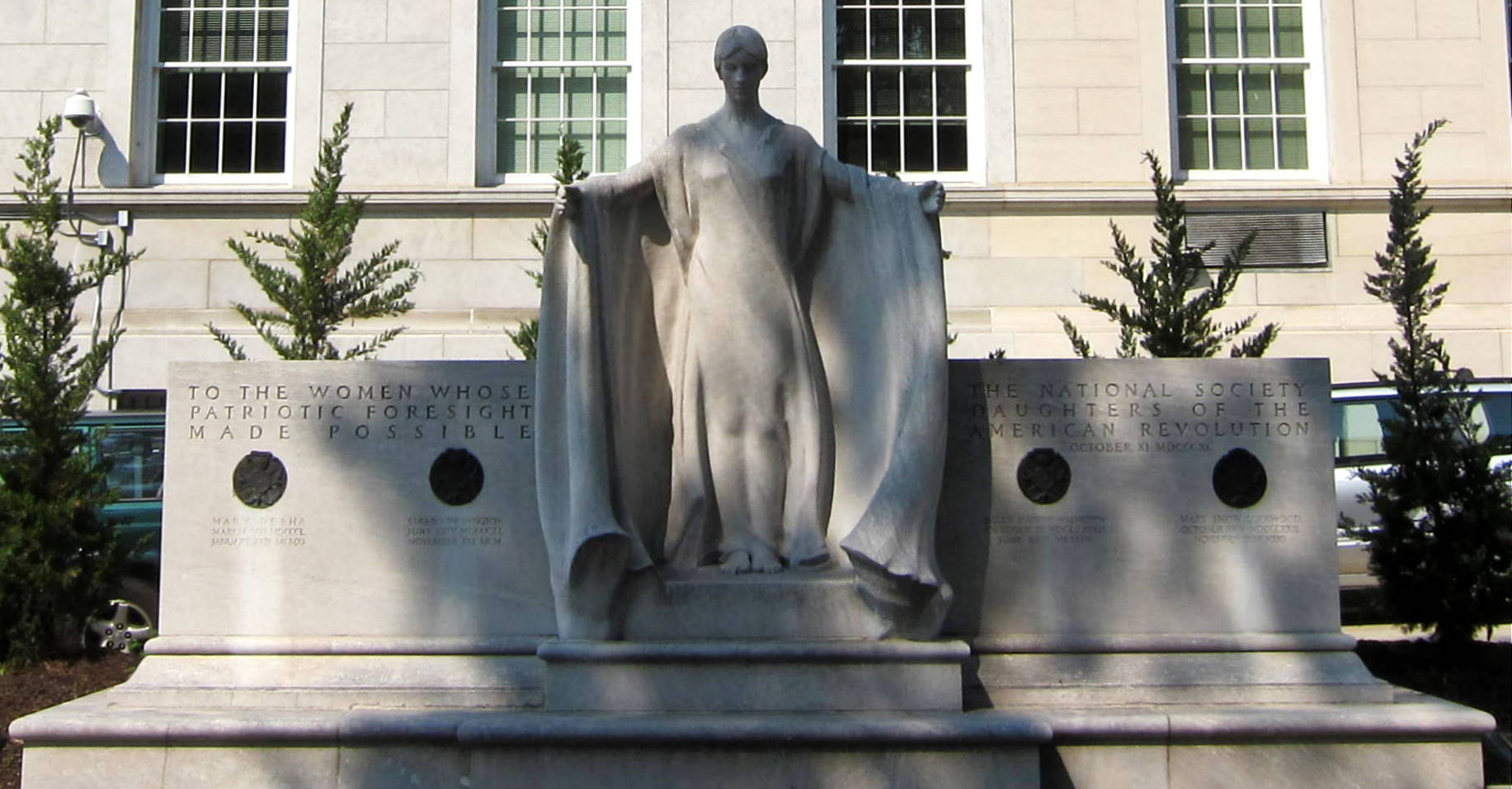
The Founders of the Daughters of the American Revolution, a 1929 marble sculpture by Gertrude Vanderbilt Whitney honoring the society's four co-founders, including Washington. It is located alongside DAR Constitution Hall in Washington, DC.

By Washington's death in 1900, membership in the National Society of Daughters of the American Revolution numbered around 35,000. Many chapters of the society expressed their appreciation and respect. She was also mentioned at the groundbreaking of the Memorial Continental Hall on October 11, 1902, by Cornelia Cole Fairbanks. In 1908, a "mourning pin" crafted on the occasion of the death of George Washington that had been given to Washington by her grandmother, Lucy Payne Washington Todd, was donated to the Memorial Continental Hall by Jennie White Hopkins.

On April 17, 1929, under the leadership of President General Grace L. H. Brosseau, the Daughters of the American Revolution dedicated a memorial to its four founders, including Washington; it was sculpted by Gertrude Vanderbilt Whitney and is located at Constitution Hall in Washington, DC. The Daughters of the American Revolution also maintained Washington's gravesite at "Glencairne", and in 1979 they installed a plaque honoring her. In October 1990, the Daughters of the American Revolution held a ceremony at her gravesite to mark the centennial jubilee of the organization's founding. On October 13, 1999, a year after their own centennial, 21 members of the Daughters of Founders and Patriots of America met at the gravesite to unveil a larger memorial plaque honoring her.

== Bibliography ==
- Brogan, Hugh; Mosley, Charles (1993). American Presidential Families. New York City, New York: Macmillan Publishing Company. ISBN 9780028973050. Archived from the original on December 15, 2019.
- Davidson, Ann Harris (2008). Then & Now: Berwyn Heights. Mount Pleasant, South Carolina: Arcadia Publishing. ISBN 9780738553672.
- du Bellet, Louise Pecquet; Jaquelin, Edward; Jaquelin, Martha Cary (1907). Some Prominent Virginia Families, Volume 4. Lynchburg, Virginia: J. P. Bell Company.
- Hetzel, Susan Rivière (1903). The Building of a Monument: A History of the Mary Washington Associations and Their Work. Press of Wickersham Company.
- James, Edward T. (1971). Notable American Women 1607–1950: A Biographical Dictionary, Volume 1. Cambridge, Massachusetts: Harvard University Press. ISBN 9780674627345. Archived from the original on May 21, 2016.
- King, Lucy Jane (2008). Madame President 1901–1905: Nellie Fairbanks, Path Finder to Politics for American Women. Bloomington, Indiana: AuthorHouse. ISBN 9781467869478.
- Marling, Karal Ann (1988). George Washington Slept Here: Colonial Revivals and American Culture, 1876–1986. Cambridge, Massachusetts: Harvard University Press. ISBN 9780674349513.
- Morgan, Francesca (2005). Women and Patriotism in Jim Crow America. Chapel Hill, North Carolina: University of North Carolina Press. ISBN 9780807876930.
- National Society of the Daughters of the American Revolution (January 1901a). "Miss Eugenia Washington". American Monthly Magazine. XVIII (1). Washington, D.C.: National Society of the Daughters of the American Revolution: 1–4. OL 13992716M.
- National Society of the Daughters of the American Revolution (1901b). Daughters of the American Revolution Magazine, Volume 18. Washington, D.C.: National Society of the Daughters of the American Revolution.
- National Society of the Daughters of the American Revolution (1908). The American Monthly Magazine, Volume 33. Washington, D.C.: National Society of the Daughters of the American Revolution.
- National Society of the Daughters of the American Revolution (1925). Proceedings of the Thirty-Fourth Continental Congress. Washington, D.C.: National Society of the Daughters of the American Revolution.
- National Society of the Sons of the American Revolution (1991). Centennial History of the National Society of the Sons of the American Revolution, 1889–1989. Nashville, Tennessee: Turner Publishing Company. ISBN 9781563110283. Archived from the original on April 25, 2016.
- Norbertine Fathers; Archconfraternity of St. Joseph (1922). Annals of St. Joseph, Volumes 34–36. Norbertine Fathers. Archived from the original on April 13, 2016.
- O'Neill, Scannell (April 1916). "Notes on Some Convert Relatives of the Presidents". The Catholic Historical Review. 2 (1). Washington, D.C.: Catholic University of America Press: 66–72. JSTOR 25011388.
- Somerville, Mollie (January 8, 1985). National Register of Historic Places Registration Form: Constitution Hall. United States Department of the Interior, National Park Service.
- Wallace, Edie; Reed, Paula S. (August 2006). National Register of Historic Places – Nomination Form: Barleywood (PDF). United States Department of the Interior, National Park Service. Archived (PDF) from the original on October 20, 2013.
