= Ruby Walworth =

American nurse, poet, and suffragist

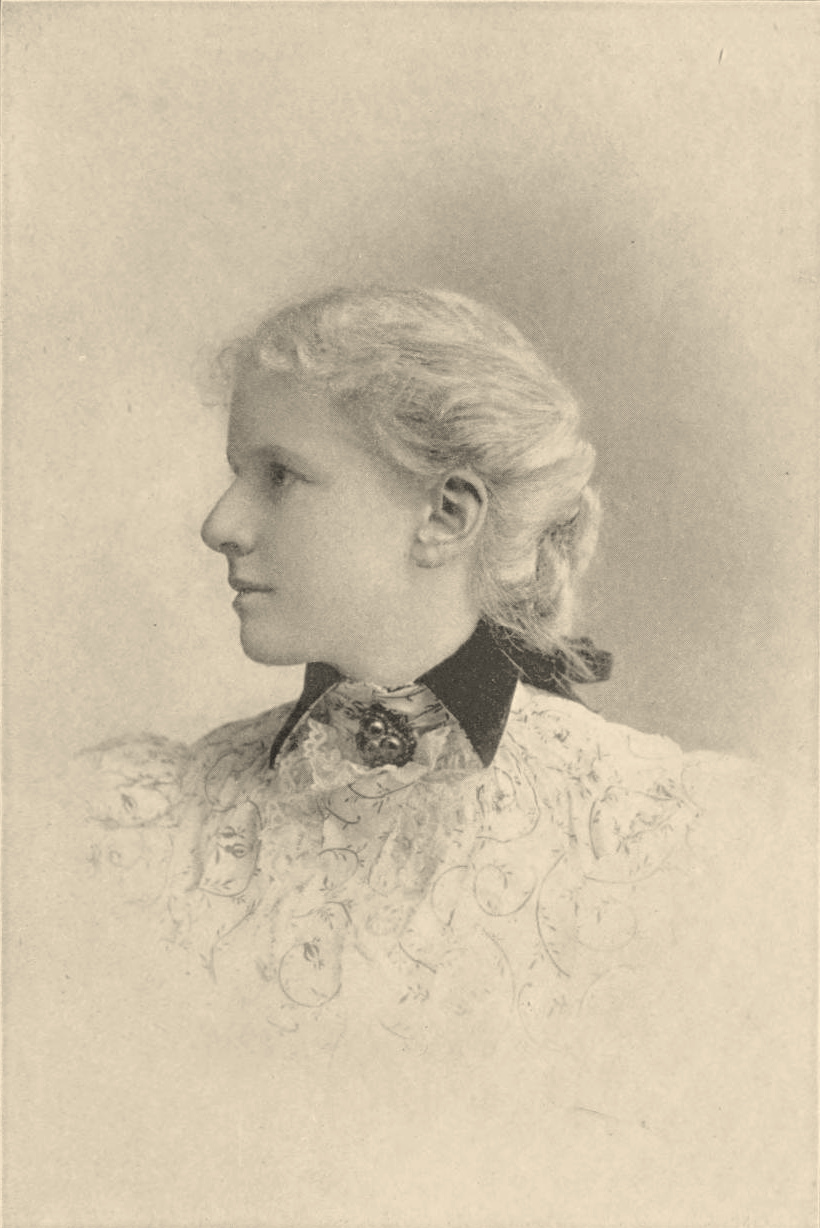
- Born: February 20, 1867; Saratoga Springs, New York, U.S.
- Died: October 18, 1898 (aged 31); New York, New York, U.S.
- Resting place: Greenridge Cemetery
- Education: Vassar College; Art Students League of New York
- Occupations: Nurse; Poet; Suffragist; Schoolteacher
- Parent(s): Mansfield Tracy Walworth (father); Ellen Hardin Walworth (mother)
- Relatives: Martin Davis Hardin (uncle); Reuben Hyde Walworth (grandfather); John J. Hardin (grandfather); Martin D. Hardin (great-grandfather)

Reubena Hyde "Ruby" Walworth (February 20, 1867 – October 18, 1898) was an American nurse, poet, and suffragist. During the Spanish–American War, she treated soldiers at Fort Monroe in Virginia at Camp Wikoff in New York.

== Early life and family ==
Walworth was born on February 20, 1867, to a wealthy and illustrious family in Saratoga Springs, New York. Her father, Mansfield Tracy Walworth, was a lawyer and writer. Her mother, Ellen Hardin Walworth, was a writer and one of the founders of the Daughters of the American Revolution. She was named after her paternal grandfather, Reuben Hyde Walworth, who served as Chancellor of New York. Through her mother, she was a relative of First Lady Mary Todd Lincoln. Her maternal grandfather was Illinois Congressman John J. Hardin.

When she was six years old, Walworth's brother, Frank, killed their abusive father in order to protect her and her mother.

== Education and career ==
In 1896, Walworth graduated from Vassar College, where she was class poet. She was also a student at the Art Students League of New York. After graduating from Vassar, she worked as a schoolteacher.

She was an advocate for women's suffrage.

During the Spanish–American War, Walworth volunteered as a nurse, training at Saratoga Hospital before being sent to Fort Monroe in Virginia. She later treated soldiers at Camp Wikoff in Montauk, New York in 1898. She volunteered to treat soldiers at the camp who had been infected with yellow fever, typhoid fever, and diphtheria. While at Camp Wikoff, she authored a poem about the soldiers:

“We are burying our boys when the cannons passed by, whom care might have saved, we have brought home to die.”

== Personal life and death ==
Like her mother, Walworth was a member of the Daughters of the American Revolution.

She started showing symptoms of typhoid fever in October 1898, at which time her family had her placed in New York City Presbyterian Hospital for treatment. She died there on October 18, 1898 and was the only nurse at Camp Wikoff to succumb to an infectious disease. She was given a full military funeral. The Daughters of the American Revolution erected a monument to her at Greenridge Cemetery in 1899.
