= Ellen Hardin Walworth =

American lawyer

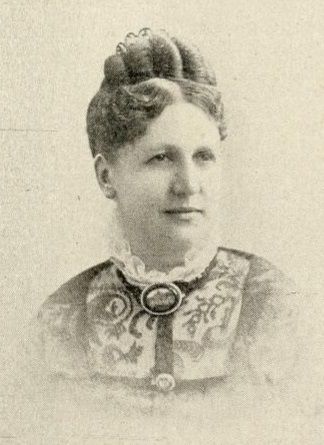
- Born: October 20, 1832; Jacksonville, Illinois, U.S.
- Died: June 23, 1915 (aged 82); Washington, D.C., U.S.
- Resting place: Greenridge Cemetery, Saratoga Springs, New York
- Education: Jacksonville Academy
- Spouse: Mansfield Tracy Walworth
- Children: 8 (including Reubena Walworth)
- Parent(s): John J. Hardin (father); Sarah Ellen Smith (mother)
- Relatives: Martin Davis Hardin (brother); Martin D. Hardin (grandfather); John Hardin (great-grandfather)

Ellen Hardin Walworth (October 20, 1832 – June 23, 1915) was an American author, lawyer, and activist who was a passionate advocate for the importance of studying history and historic preservation. Walworth was one of the founders of the Daughters of the American Revolution and was the organization's first secretary general. She was the first editor of the DAR's official magazine, American Monthly Magazine. In 1893, during a speech at the World's Columbian Exposition (Chicago World Fair), Walworth was one of the first people to propose the establishment of the United States National Archives. Walworth was one of the first women in New York State to hold a position on a local board of education, a role that was frequently used to bolster the call for women's suffrage.

During the Spanish–American War, Walworth and other influential women established the Women's National War Relief Association to offer aid to the war effort. Walworth, the impetus behind the organization, was the Director-general of new association.

In her personal life, Walworth was a victim of domestic violence with tragic consequences when her son, Frank, killed his father after years of intervening to protect his mother. Walworth studied law to gain the knowledge to overturn the conviction of her son for killing her abusive former husband.

== Family life ==
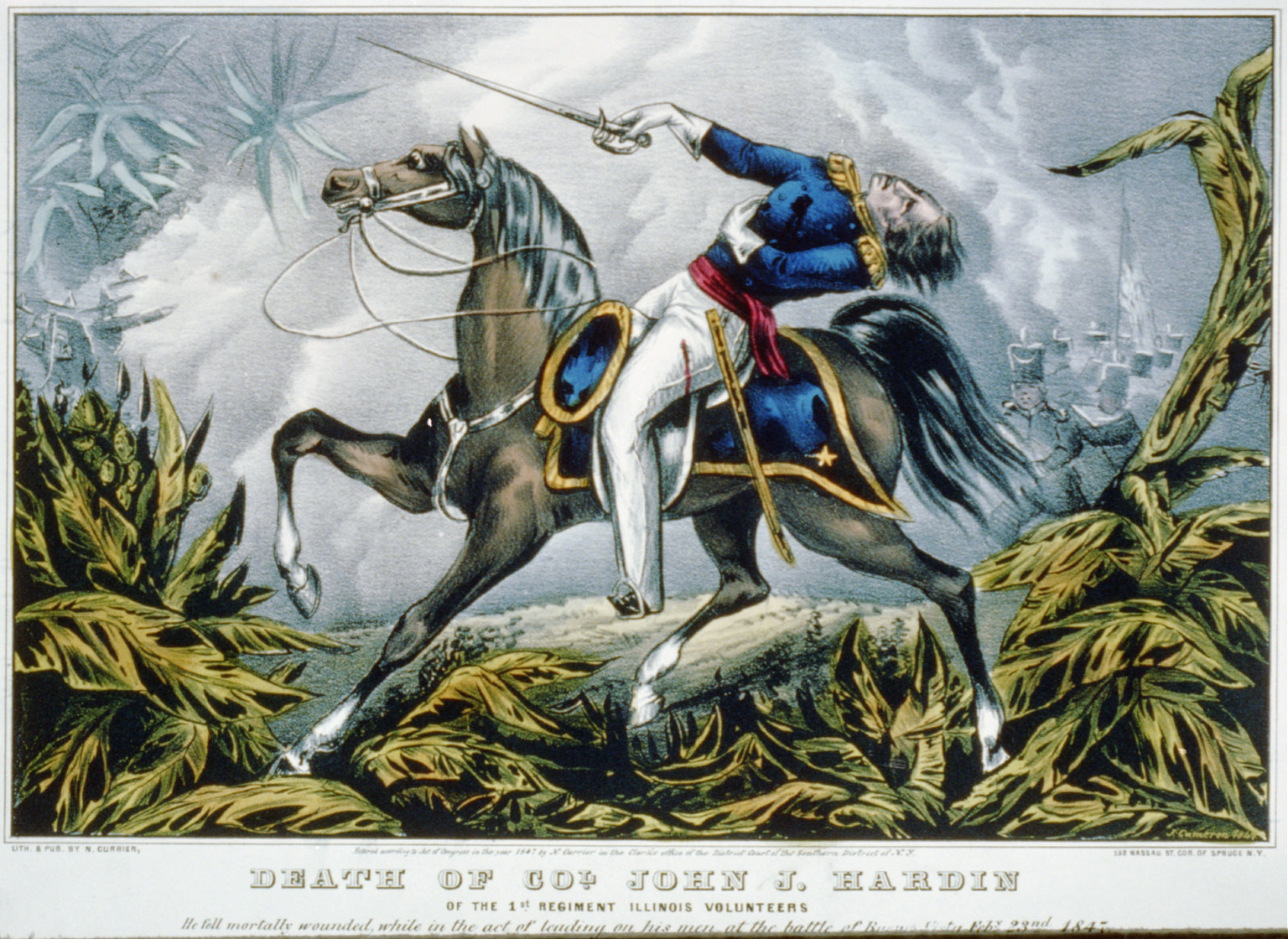
Portail of the death of Walworth's father, John J. Hardin, at the Battle of Buena Vista.

Ellen Hardin was born on October 20, 1832, in Jacksonville, Illinois, into the well known Hardin family of Kentucky. She was the oldest of four siblings born to John J. and Sarah Ellen (Smith) Hardin. John's parents were Martin D. Hardin, a prominent statesman from Kentucky who served in the United States Senate, and Elizabeth Logan. John Hardin was a lawyer and a member of United States Congress as a member of the Whig Party. She was a great-granddaughter of John Hardin and Jane Davies and a descendant of General Benjamin Logan.

Ellen was educated at Jacksonville Academy. Additionally, Ellen was heavily influenced by the wide supply of English literature and history reading materials which were offered in the family library. In 1846, John Hardin joined the United States Army to fight against Mexico and was killed in the Battle of Buena Vista. The family remained in Jacksonville until 1851 when Sarah Hardin married the Honorable Reuben Hyde Walworth, the last chancellor of New York State, and moved the family to Saratoga Springs, New York, to live on the family estate, Pine Grove. Many members of the Walworth family were converted to the Roman Catholic faith by a family member, Rev. Clarence A. Walworth, who was a missionary priest. After moving to Pine Grove, Ellen changed her religious affiliation from Presbyterian to Roman Catholic.

=== Marriage and domestic life ===
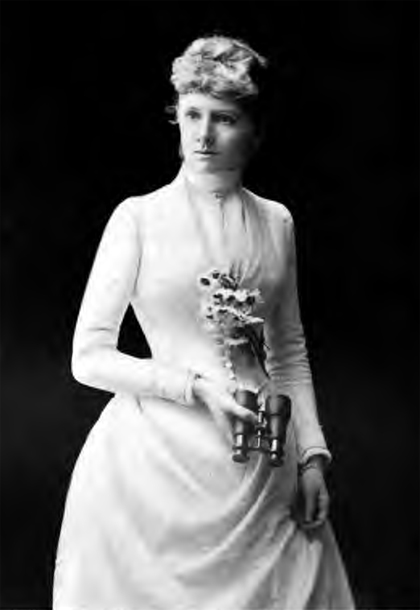
Reubena Hyde "Ruby" Walworth

In 1852, Ellen married Mansfield Tracy Walworth, her stepfather's youngest son, and resided with him at Pine Grove. Mansfield Walworth was a lawyer by training who was a prolific writer and gained minor fame as novelist. Ellen and Mansfield had six children in rapid succession: Francis Hardin, John J., Mary Elizabeth, Ellen Hardin, Clara Teresa, and Mansfield Tracy. Two children were born later, Reubena Hyde and Sarah Margaret.

Her daughter Reubena died of typhoid fever while nursing soldiers at Fort Monroe and Montauk Point. Her tombstone reads: "She served her flag -- not as a man, but better still: as only woman can." Fortress Monroe Montauk, Spanish–American War, 1898. It was erected by the Daughters of the American Revolution, of which both mother and daughter were member.

Walworth's husband was an "unstable person" with a "violent temper" who physically assaulted her. In 1861, she separated from her husband and moved with her children to live on a farm near Louisville, Kentucky. After several failed attempts to reconcile, she went to Washington in 1868, and secured a government clerkship. Walworth tried reconciling one last time after she lost her job, but she left him permanently in January 1871 after he physically assaulted her while she was pregnant with Sarah Margaret. She returned to Saratoga, and obtained a "limited divorce".

=== Frank Walworth's murder of Mansfield Walworth ===
After the divorce, Mansfield Walworth continued to threaten his former wife. After failed attempts by family members to intervene on her behalf, on June 3, 1873, her oldest son, Frank, shot his father to death in a New York City hotel room. After a widely publicized trial that included Ellen Walworth testifying on behalf of her son, Frank was sentenced to life imprisonment on July 5, 1873. Following the conviction, Walworth "devoted herself to securing his release which she achieved in 1877 on the ground of insanity." In August 1877, New York Governor Robinson pardoned Frank Walworth on the grounds that the prisoner was not legally responsible for the crime due to insanity. Walworth studied law to gain the knowledge needed in order to overturn the conviction of her son.

== Career ==
In order to bring in a stable income for the family, Walworth opened the family homestead, first as a boarding school for young women, and then later as a summer hotel. According to the New York Times (April 30, 1896) Walworth earned her law degree in 1896 at New York University Walworth did not practice law. For a short time, she was employed as a clerk for the United States government in Washington, D.C.

== Writer ==
Walworth wrote constantly on historic subjects. She was an authority on the battlefields of Saratoga and also published an account of the Burgoyne campaign. Walworth was interested in science, in particular geology, and was among "the few women of her time to present a paper to the American Association for the Advancement of Science." Her paper, "Field Work By Amateurs" was presented at the August 1880 Conference in Boston and published in Proceedings of the American Association for the Advancement of Science. In the paper, Walworth passionately advocated for more popular science work done by and with amateurs, especially more participation by women.

== Community service ==
During the final decades of the 19th century and early into the 20th century, membership in community organizations was an important part of professional and social life in the United States. Being a woman, Walworth by normal conventions, was excluded from membership in many prominent organizations. To overcome this issue, women either pressed to join these organizations, or established alternative organizations. Walworth did both, with the Daughters of the American Revolution being a notable example of women creating a new organization after being excluded from membership in prominent patriotic lineage organizations. Walworth joined and founded community organizations that reflected her interests in history. She identified as a suffragist but was not heavily involved with the women's suffrage movement. Instead, she joined numerous clubs that were previously exclusive to men, often being the first and sole female member.

=== Historic preservation ===
Walworth had a strong interest in the restoration and preservation of historical sites. She was on the forefront of the movement to raise public funds to purchase and restore historical properties. In 1876, Walworth advocated for funds to renovate George Washington’s home, Mount Vernon, near Alexandria, Virginia. Walworth was active in the Saratoga Monument Association, and for 18 years she was the only female trustee in the organization. She was chair of the committee on tablets, and undertook the task of researching the battles and soliciting funds to place a marker at each site. On July 12, 1893 at the World's Columbian Exposition she presented her paper, The Value of National Archives to a Nation’s Life and Progress to the American Historical Association arguing for the creation of a national archives in the United States.

=== Daughters of the American Revolution ===
After being excluded from the Sons of the American Revolution, a men's patriotic lineage organization, a group of women in the nation's capital, including Walworth, formed their own organization, the Daughters of the American Revolution, in October 1890. She is recognized, along with Mary Desha, Eugenia Washington, and Mary Smith Lockwood, as one of the founders of the Daughters of the American Revolution. Walworth was the first editor of the official publication of the Daughters of the American Revolution, the American Monthly Magazine, serving as editor from the spring of 1892 until July 1894.

=== Women's National War Relief Association ===
The Women's National War Relief Association was a relief organization founded during the Spanish–American War to give comfort to the officers, soldiers and sailors in the United States Military. During the Spanish–American War, Walworth and other influential women established the Women's National War Relief Association to collect monetary donations and to offer aid to soldiers. Walworth, the impetus behind the organization, was the Director-general of new association.

== Death and legacy ==
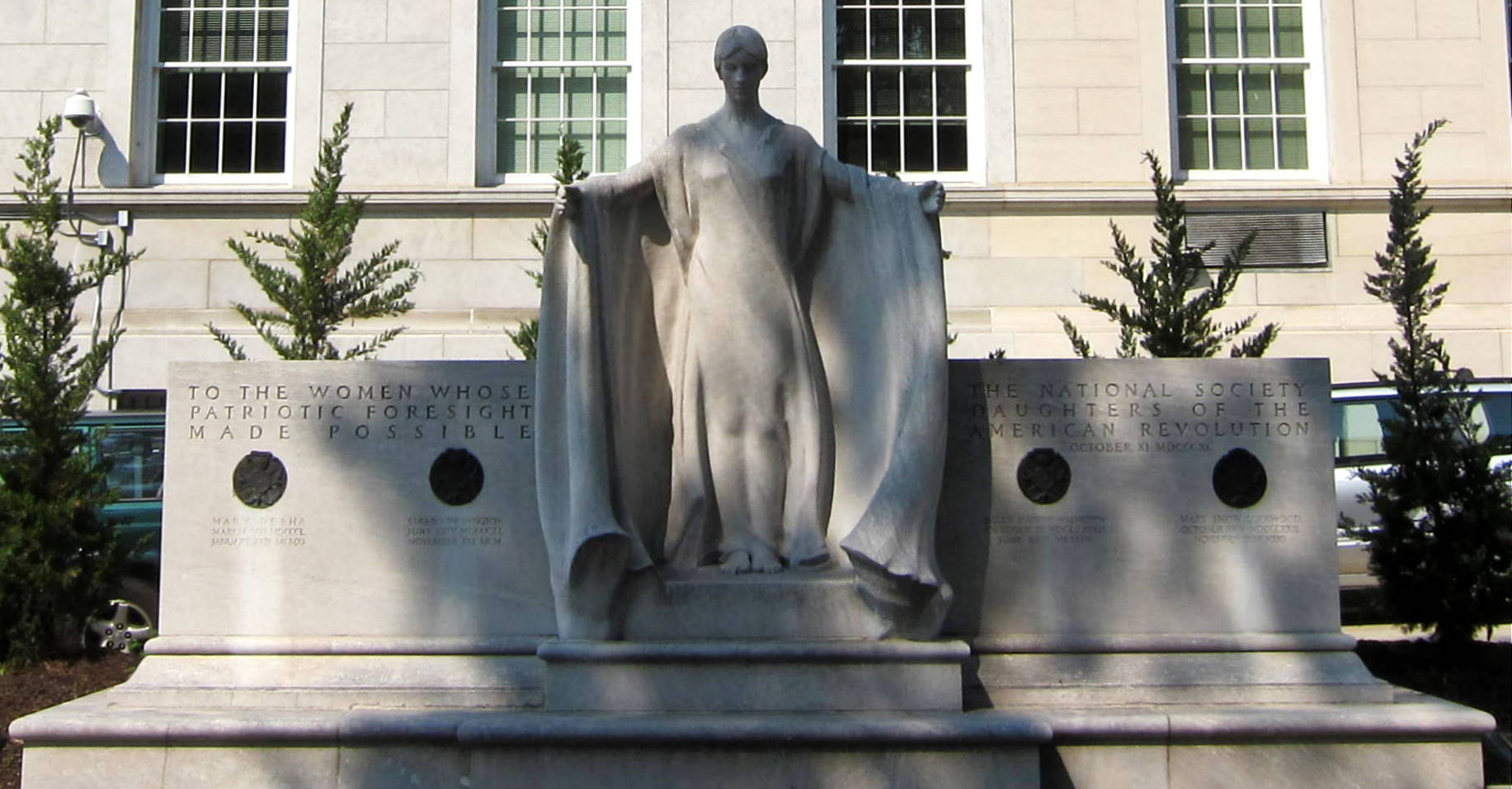
The Founders of the Daughters of the American Revolution honors Walworth and the other co-founders of the DAR.

Walworth died in Georgetown University Hospital in Washington on June 23, 1915, and was buried at Greenridge Cemetery, Saratoga Springs, New York. On April 17, 1929, under the leadership of President General Grace L. H. Brosseau, the Daughters of the American Revolution dedicated a memorial to its four founders, including Walworth. The memorial was sculpted by Gertrude Vanderbilt Whitney and is located at Constitution Hall in Washington D.C. A marble bust of Walworth was sculpted by Adelaide Johnson and was put in Memorial Continental Hall, Washington, D.C to honor her. Walworth is included in biographic books and papers about women who were trailblazers. In 2002, Allison P. Bennett wrote a biography about Walworth called Saratoga Sojourn: a biography of Ellen Hardin Walworth. The book primarily covers the time period and events from when Walworth relocated to Saratoga with her mother, her domestic life with Mansfield, her son's murder of his father, and her mission to overturn his murder conviction. Along the way Bennett tells about the life of a woman who was ahead of her times with her interests and accomplishments as a businesswoman, writer, historian, women's rights activist, and community organizer.

The Walworth Memorial Museum is housed in the Saratoga Springs History Museum. The seven room museum includes material about the lives of Ellen Hardin Walworth and her family.
