= American Monthly Magazine =

American Monthly Magazine may refer to:

- American Monthly Magazine (1833), founded in 1833 and edited by Henry William Herbert
- American Monthly Magazine (NSDAR), former organ of the National Society of the Daughters of the American Revolution
