= Mansfield Tracy Walworth =

American writer (1830–1873)

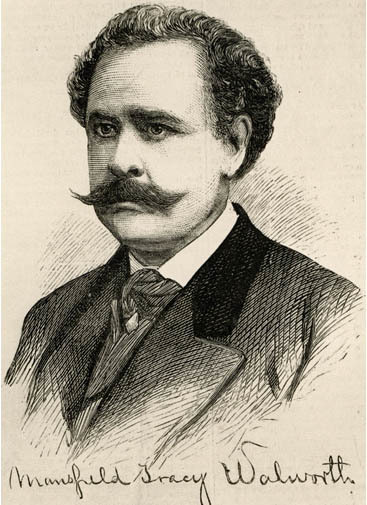
- Illustration of Walworth
- Born: December 3, 1830; Albany, New York, U.S.
- Died: June 3, 1873 (aged 42); New York City, New York, U.S.
- Resting place: Greenridge Cemetery, Saratoga Springs, New York, U.S.
- Education: Union College
- Occupation: Writer
- Spouse: Ellen Hardin Walworth
- Children: 8 (including Reubena Hyde Walworth)

Mansfield Tracy Walworth (December 3, 1830 – June 3, 1873) was an American writer.

== Biography ==
Born in 1830, the son of Reuben H. Walworth, State Chancellor of New York, and Maria Ketchum Averill. In 1852, he married Ellen Hardin Walworth, his step sister. The marriage would break up due to his abusive tendencies.

In 1873, Walworth was murdered by his son, Frank Walworth, at the Sturdevant House Hotel, Manhattan. He was buried in Greenridge Cemetery in Saratoga Springs, New York.

== Bibliography ==
- The Mission of Death: A Tale of the New York Penal Laws (1850)
- Hotspur.: A Tale of the Old Dutch Manor (1864)
- Warwick: or, The Lost Nationalities of America. A Novel (1869)
- Stormcliff. A Tale of the Highlands (1871)
- Lulu. A Tale of the National Hotel Poisoning (1871)
- Delaplaine: or, The Sacrifice of Irene. A Novel (1872)
- Beverly; or, The White Mask (1872)
- Married in Mask: A Novel (1888)
- Zahara, or A Leap for Empire (1888)
