= John Hardin =

Revolutionary War militia officer & Indian fighter

- Born: October 1, 1753; Prince William County, Virginia
- Died: May 1792 (aged 38); Turtle Creek, Ohio
- Spouse: Jane Daviess
- Children: Seven, including Martin D. Hardin
- Military career
- Branch: Virginia militia; Continental Army; Kentucky militia
- Rank: Colonel
- Units: 8th Pennsylvania Regiment; Morgan's Rifles
- Conflicts: Lord Dunmore's War; McDonald’s Expedition (WIA); American Revolution; Battle of Saratoga; Northwest Indian War; Hardin-Patton Expedition; Wabash Expedition; Harmar campaign; Blackberry Campaign

John Hardin (October 1, 1753 – May 1792) was an American soldier, scout, and frontiersman. As a young man, he fought in Lord Dunmore's War, in which he was wounded, and gained a reputation as a marksman and "Indian killer." He served in the Continental Army during the American Revolutionary War, where he played a noteworthy role in the American victory at Saratoga in 1777. After the war, he moved to Kentucky, where he fought against Native Americans in the Northwest Indian War. In 1790, he led a detachment of Kentucky militia in a disastrous defeat known as "Hardin's Defeat." In 1792, he was killed while serving as an emissary to the Natives in the Northwest Territory.

== Biography ==
John Hardin was born on October 1, 1753, in Fauquier County, Virginia, the first son and fifth child of Martin Hardin (1716–1789) and Lydia (Waters) Hardin. His father was a large landowner who moved his family from Fauquier County to western Pennsylvania when John was twelve years old. Martin Hardin served in the Pennsylvania militia during the American Revolutionary War. Growing up on the frontier, John Hardin became an expert hunter and marksman. He married Jane Daviess; they would have seven children, including Martin D. Hardin, who became a U.S. Senator from Kentucky.

In 1774, Hardin joined a militia company raised by Lord Dunmore, the royal governor of Virginia, as an ensign. In August 1774, at the outset of Lord Dunmore's War, Virginia militiamen led by Angus McDonald invaded the Ohio Country and destroyed several Native towns on the Muskingum River. Hardin took part in this expedition as a private in a company from Monongalia County led by Captain Zackquill Morgan. On August 2, Hardin was wounded in a skirmish at Snake's Town. A musket ball "penetrated his thigh and lodged near his groin." The musket ball remained in him for the rest of his life. While recovering from the wound, he is said to have accompanied Lord Dunmore's subsequent expedition while on crutches. Hardin's frontier exploits gained him a reputation as an "Indian Killer."

During the American Revolutionary War, John Hardin was a second lieutenant in the 8th Pennsylvania Regiment. He was one of a select number of riflemen chosen to serve in a Regiment detachment known as the Provisional Rifle Corps (or "Morgan's Rifles"). During this time, he fought at Saratoga serving directly under Colonel Daniel Morgan. His exploits in the battle are commemorated by a historical marker at Saratoga National Historical Park.

In 1786, after the war, John Hardin and his family settled on a large parcel of land in Washington County, Virginia (now Washington County, Kentucky), where they farmed and raised livestock. They also joined the Methodist church in that area. Hardin had some success as a rancher, continually adding acreage to his original tract. As a militia captain in 1786, Hardin led an attack on a Piankeshaw village near present-day Vincennes, Indiana. This village belonged to a friendly tribe that had been allies with the colonial Americans. In August 1789, he led another militia expedition to Terre Haute, where he attacked a Shawnee party of twenty-two men, women, and children. Three women, one child, and an infant were killed in the attack. Hardin paraded through Vincennes, but Major Jean François Hamtramck lamented that the uneasy peace he had brokered with the Wabash nations would soon end due to the "provocation" of this "Kentucky affair." Hardin returned to Kentucky with twelve scalps.

Hardin was promoted to colonel and repeatedly engaged Indians during the Northwest Indian War in the Northwest Territory. In 1790, he led a detachment of the Kentucky County militia in the disastrous Battle of Heller's Corner (also known as "Hardin's Defeat"). This defeat began a long succession of American losses to a Miami chief named Little Turtle. In 1791, Hardin led a force of sixty mounted militiamen, destroying a large Kickapoo village near the mouth of the Big Pine Creek. This was part of General Charles Scott's campaign to conquer Ouiatenon.

In May 1792, General James Wilkinson sent Hardin as an emissary to carry American peace terms to the Natives along the Sandusky River. After leaving Fort Washington, Hardin encountered a party of Shawnees, who offered to escort him. While Hardin was sleeping one night, the Shawnees killed him and his servant Freeman. Hardin's guide survived.

== Legacy ==
Hardin County, Kentucky; Hardin County, Illinois; and Hardin County, Ohio were named for John Hardin. The town of Hardin, Ohio, which is near the location where he was killed, is named for him. John Hardin High School in Radcliff, Kentucky, also bears his name.

His son Martin D. Hardin, who married Ann Logan, daughter of General Benjamin Logan. His second-oldest son, Mark, married Mary Adair, daughter of Kentucky governor, John Adair. His grandson, Congressman John J. Hardin, was killed at the Battle of Buena Vista, Mexico. His nephew, Congressman Benjamin Hardin was the father in law of Kentucky Governor John L. Helm and grandfather of General Benjamin Hardin Helm.
