= Women's National War Relief Association =

American relief organization founded during the Spanish–American War

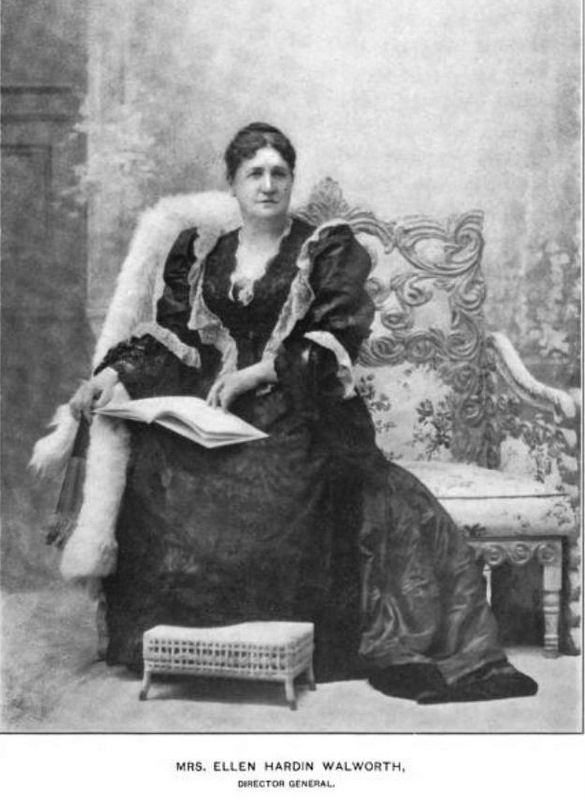
Ellen Hardin Walworth, Founder of Daughters of the American Revolution, writer, women's rights advocate.

The Women's National War Relief Association was an American relief organization founded during the Spanish–American War to give comfort to the officers, soldiers and sailors in the United States Military. The women founding the association used the group as a means for women "to supplement with material aid the sacrifices of time, strength, and life made by the men of the nation" during the military conflict.

== Founding ==
The Women's National War Relief Association was incorporated at Albany, New York on May 31, 1898. According to a report in The American monthly review of reviews, its president was Mrs. General U. S. Grant, its director-general Mrs. Ellen Hardin Walworth, and its assistant director-general Helen Miller Gould. The board of vice-presidents comprised the wife of the Attorney-General, Mrs. John W. Griggs, along with the wives of the governors of Massachusetts, Rhode Island, Wyoming, Illinois, Virginia, Wyoming, Colorado, Connecticut, Ohio, North Dakota, Kentucky, Alabama, Oklahoma, Georgia, Idaho, Washington, New Mexico, Oregon, Montana, Arkansas, South Dakota, West Virginia, Maine, and Pennsylvania. The constitution was adopted in May 1898.

== Activities ==
The early work of the Association included fitting out the ambulance ship Relief with a carbonating plant, electric fans, canvas awnings, food, and medical supplies, and Fortress Monroe was provided with ten chefs and 10 of assistants to assist with meals. Nine nurses were sent to Fortress Monroe from July 9 to October 10. The association made a monetary contribution of $100 a week for the convalescent table.

Three thousand dollars was distributed through official channels to aid in the equipment of the ambulance ships Relief, of the War Department, and Navy Department ship, Solace. Hospital supplies were sent to the United States Marine Corps at Santiago.

After the close of the war $2,500 worth of supplies were sent to Santiago, and also a steam launch, at a cost of $1,600, was supplied for the yellow-fever hospital about two miles from Santiago.
