= Seventh Army Corps (Spanish–American War) =

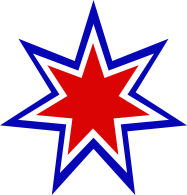
- Active: May 7, 1898 – May 1, 1899
- Country: United States of America
- Branch: Army of the United States
- Type: Corps
- Role: Infantry
- Size: 1,025 officers, 27,817 enlisted men (on 8/31/1898)
- Engagements: Spanish–American War

Commanders
- Notable commanders: Major General Fitzhugh Lee

Insignia
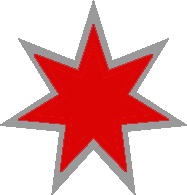
- Seventh Corps 1st Division

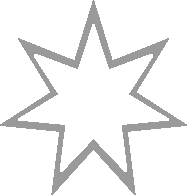
- Seventh Corps 2nd Division

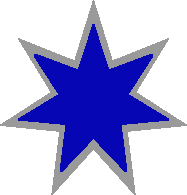
- Seventh Corps 3rd Division

The Seventh Army Corps was a unit of the United States Army raised for the Spanish–American War. After the declaration of war, General Order 36 of May 7, 1898 defined the organization of eight "army corps," each of which was to consist of three or more divisions of three brigades each.

Each brigade was to have approximately 3,600 officers and enlisted men organized into three regiments and, with three such brigades, each division was to total about 11,000 officers and men. Thus the division was to be about the same size as the division of 1861, but army corps were to be larger. The division staff initially was to have an adjutant general, quartermaster, commissary, surgeon, inspector general and engineer, with an ordnance officer added later. The brigade staff was identical except that no inspector general or ordnance officer was authorized.

General Order 46 of May 16, 1898 assigned commanding officers and training camps to the army corps; Major General Fitzhugh Lee was named as commander of Seventh Army Corps, which was to assemble at Tampa, Florida.

On May 29, the War Department authorized General Lee to move his headquarters to Jacksonville, Florida, where he established Camp Cuba Libre. The corps' First Division (division names were not unique in this era) remained at Tampa and was swapped on June 27 for the First Division of the Fourth Army Corps, under Brigadier General Theodore Schwan, encamped at Miami. On July 4, Schwan was relieved and replaced by Major General J. Warren Keifer; this division was ordered to Jacksonville on July 31.

The corps was ordered to move to Savannah, Georgia on October 8 and it embarked for Cuba during December 1898 and January 1899 for occupation duty in Havana Province.

During March 1899 the strength of the corps was reduced by over half, from 14,972 officers and men to 5,617; Seventh Army Corps was "discontinued" on May 1, 1899.
