= Hannah White Arnett =

American revolutionary

- Born: Hannah White; January 15, 1733; Bridgehampton, Province of New York, British Empire
- Died: January 10, 1823 (aged 89); Elizabethtown, New Jersey, U.S.
- Spouse: Isaac Arnett
- Children: 18
- Parent(s): Silas White; Sarah Howell

Hannah White Arnett (January 15, 1733 – January 10, 1823) was a Colonial American woman who is known for preventing a group of men in Elizabethtown, Province of New Jersey (now Elizabeth, New Jersey) from proclaiming their loyalty to Great Britain in exchange for "protection of life and property." Discouraged, the men decided not to accept amnesty. She stated why it was important to remain devoted to independence and they changed their minds.

The Daughters of the American Revolution was organized when she could not be honored by the Sons of the American Revolution. A chapter was formed in her name and a memorial to her and other patriots was erected in the cemetery of the First Presbyterian Church of Elizabeth, New Jersey.

== Personal life ==
Hannah White, born on January 15, 1733 in Bridgehampton, New York, specifically Long Island, New York, as the eldest daughter of Sarah Howell and Silas White. On May 6, 1753, she married husband Isaac William Arnett, becoming Hannah White Arnett. Together, they had 18 children, at least 10 sons and 8 daughters, and lived in Elizabethtown, now Elizabeth, New Jersey. Hannah and her husband were both Quakers during the time of the American Revolutionary War, in which Hannah is regarded as an American patriot.

== American Revolution ==
Charles Cornwallis, a British soldier, under General William Howe, drove George Washington out of New York and into New Jersey during the Capture of New York City of the New York and New Jersey campaign. Cornwallis was then victorious at the Battle of Fort Lee (November 19, 1776), after which he encamped at Elizabethtown. By that time, the colonists were despondent and hopeless after a succession of defeats.

General Howe made the colonists an offer on November 30, 1776. (Note: Cornwallis was also said to have communicated the offer. Cornwallis served under Howe.) If the colonists claimed to be loyalists, meaning loyal to The Crown, within 60 days they would receive amnesty. As British subjects, they would not fight against the British soldiers. A group of men met in the parlor of the Arnetts' house to discuss the matter. Many of the men were not sure that the patriots would win the war and considered seeking amnesty. Hannah overheard the men talking about accepting the offer from another room and became upset. Unusual for Hannah and other woman of the time, she entered the room and interrupted their political discussion. Her husband tried to stop her, but she would not leave. She asked if they were men or cowards. The men replied that the men were starving and poorly clothed. They felt it was hopeless against Britain's financial and military strength. Her most famous quote is as follows:

We may be poor and weak and few... England may have her limitless resources. But we have something that England has not. God is on our side. Every volley from our muskets is an echo of His voice. Shame upon you cowards!

Isaac attempted to quiet her and make excuses for her, but she continued her pleas. She said that she would leave her husband if he would not continue to support the American Revolution. The men refused the offer of amnesty. They agreed to be loyal patriots until independence was secured.

== Death ==
Hannah died on January 10, 1823, in Elizabethtown, New Jersey. Isaac died on July 18, 1807.

== Legacy ==
In 1876, Henrietta Holdich wrote about the account in the New York Observer. On July 13, 1890, after the Sons of the American Revolution refused to allow women to join their group, Mary Smith Lockwood published the story of Hannah White Arnett in The Washington Post, ending her piece with the question, "Where will the Sons and Daughters of the American Revolution place Hannah Arnett?" On July 21 of that year, William O. McDowell, a great-grandson of Hannah White Arnett, published an article in The Washington Post offering to help form a society to be known as the Daughters of the American Revolution.

=== Daughters of the American Revolution ===
The first meeting of the society was held August 9, 1890. The Hannah White Arnett Chapter of the Daughters of the American Revolution was named after her; it is a Fort Payne, Alabama chapter.

=== Memorial ===
A memorial "honoring the patriotic dead of many wars laid to rest in this hallowed ground especially a noble woman Hannah White Arnett" was erected in 1938 in the cemetery of the First Presbyterian Church of Elizabeth, New Jersey by the Boudinot Chapter of the Daughters of the American Revolution. Another marker on the wall of that cemetery, which is now illegible, read in part, "Near here rests Hannah White Arnett... Her patriotic words, uttered in the dark days of 1776, summoned discouraged men to keep Elizabethtown loyal to the cause of American independence."

== Bibliography ==
- Lockwood, Mary S. (Mary Smith); Ragan, Emily Lee Sherwood (1906). Story of the records, D.A.R. Washington, D.C.: George E. Howard.
