= Mary Desha =

American activist (1850–1911)

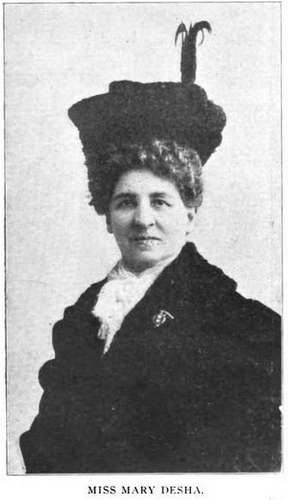
- Desha, from a 1907 publication
- Born: Mary Desha; March 8, 1850; Lexington, Kentucky
- Died: January 29, 1911 (aged 60)
- Education: Agricultural and Mechanical College of Kentucky
- Occupations: schoolteacher civil servant
- Parent(s): John Randolph Desha; Mary Curry
- Relatives: Joseph Desha (grandfather)

Mary Desha (March 8, 1850 – January 29, 1911) was an American clubwoman, educator, and civil servant who was one of the founders of Daughters of the American Revolution. She served as the Assistant Director of the DAR Hospital Corps during the Spanish–American War. Desha taught in Kentucky and Alaska schools and worked for the Office of Indian Affairs.

== Early life ==
Desha was born on March 8, 1850, in Lexington, Kentucky, to Dr. John Randolph Desha and Mary Bracken Curry Desha. She was a granddaughter of Kentucky Governor Joseph Desha, who served as a private during the American Revolutionary War and as a major general in the War of 1812. She was also a descendant of Katherine Montgomery, a dispatch bearer during the American Revolution whose husband, Isaac Bledsoe, served as a colonel in the Continental Army.

Desha attended the University of Kentucky (at that time known as "Agricultural and Mechanical College of Kentucky"), after which she taught at a private school which she and her mother had founded.

== Career ==
After attending the University of Kentucky, she obtained a job with the Lexington public school system until December 1885, when she began work as a clerk in Washington, D.C. In 1888, she began teaching in Sitka, Alaska. She wrote to the government in Washington about the poor living conditions of the Alaskan natives, which resulted in a federal investigation.

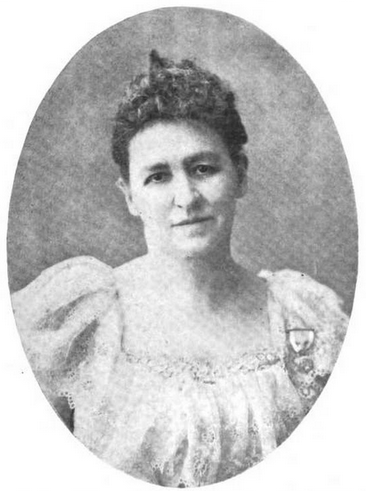
Mary Desha (1911)

Also while in Sitka she whipped a student, and his father and others went to the school board to complain; this may have helped lead to the end of corporal punishment in Alaskan public schools. A note appeared in the Tacoma Ledger in January 1889, stating, "The Board of Education of Alaska has abolished flogging in the public school. This is a green laurel in the frosty crown of our northerly sister that will distinguish her as a leader in humanitarianism. Flogging school children is a relic of barbarism that casts a sad reflection upon our boasted civilization and scientific achievements."

In 1889, she returned to Lexington, but soon went to Washington to work as a clerk in the pension office, and later worked as a copyist for the Office of Indian Affairs. For the rest of her life she continued working in the civil service, as well as acting as an Assistant Director of the Daughters of the American Revolution Hospital Corps during the Spanish–American War in 1898.

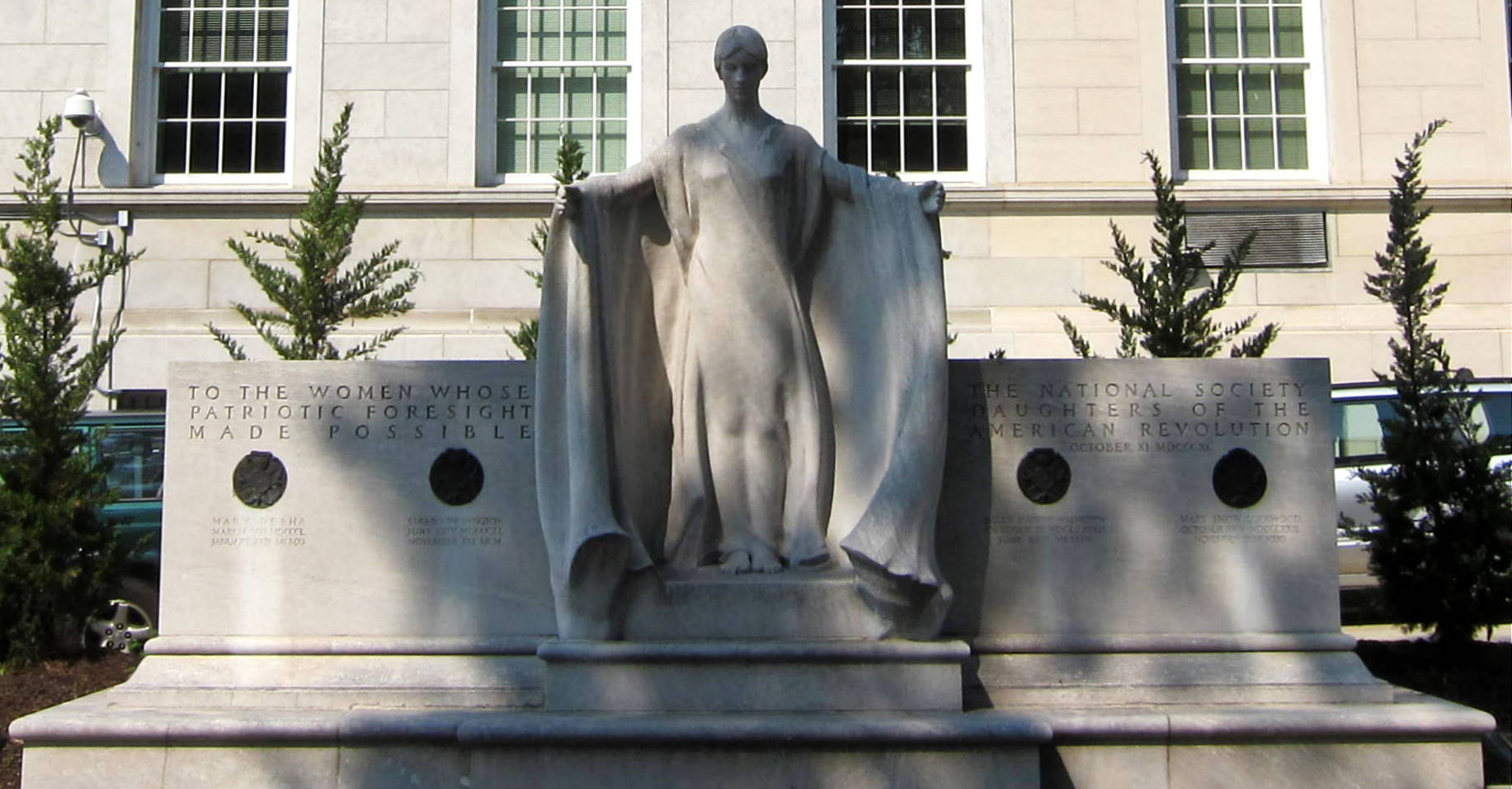
The Founders of the Daughters of the American Revolution honors Desha and the other co-founders of the DAR.

The first official meeting of the first chapter (branch) of the Daughters of the American Revolution began at 2 p.m. on October 11, 1890, in Strathmore Arms, the residence of Mary Smith Lockwood, one of the four co-founders. Sons of the American Revolution members Registrar General Dr. George Brown Goode, Secretary General A. Howard Clark, William O. McDowell (SAR member #1), Wilson L. Gill (secretary at the inaugural meeting), and 18 other people also met at the Strathmore Arms that day, but Desha, Lockwood, Ellen Hardin Walworth, and Eugenia Washington are called co-founders since they had held two or three planning meetings in August 1890.

== Legacy ==
- At Desha's death the first memorial service ever held in Memorial Continental Hall was held for her by the Daughters of the American Revolution.
- A memorial to the Daughters of the American Revolution's four founders (including Desha), located at Constitution Hall in Washington, D.C., was dedicated on April 17, 1929, during the administration of President General Grace Lincoln Hall Brosseau. The sculptor, Gertrude Vanderbilt Whitney, was a DAR member.
- The Mary Desha Chapter of Daughters of the American Revolution is located in the District of Columbia.
