= Hardin, Ohio =

Unincorporated community in Ohio, U.S.

Coordinates: 40°17′11″N 84°14′32″W

Hardin is an unincorporated community in Shelby County, in the U.S. state of Ohio.

== History ==
Hardin was platted in 1816. The community was named for John Hardin (1753–1792), a Continental Army officer in the American Revolutionary War. who was killed on this site in 1792. Hardin was the county seat from 1819 until 1820. A post office called Hardin was established in 1820, and discontinued in 1909.
