= Sallie Foster Harshbarger =

American clubwoman (1874–1958)

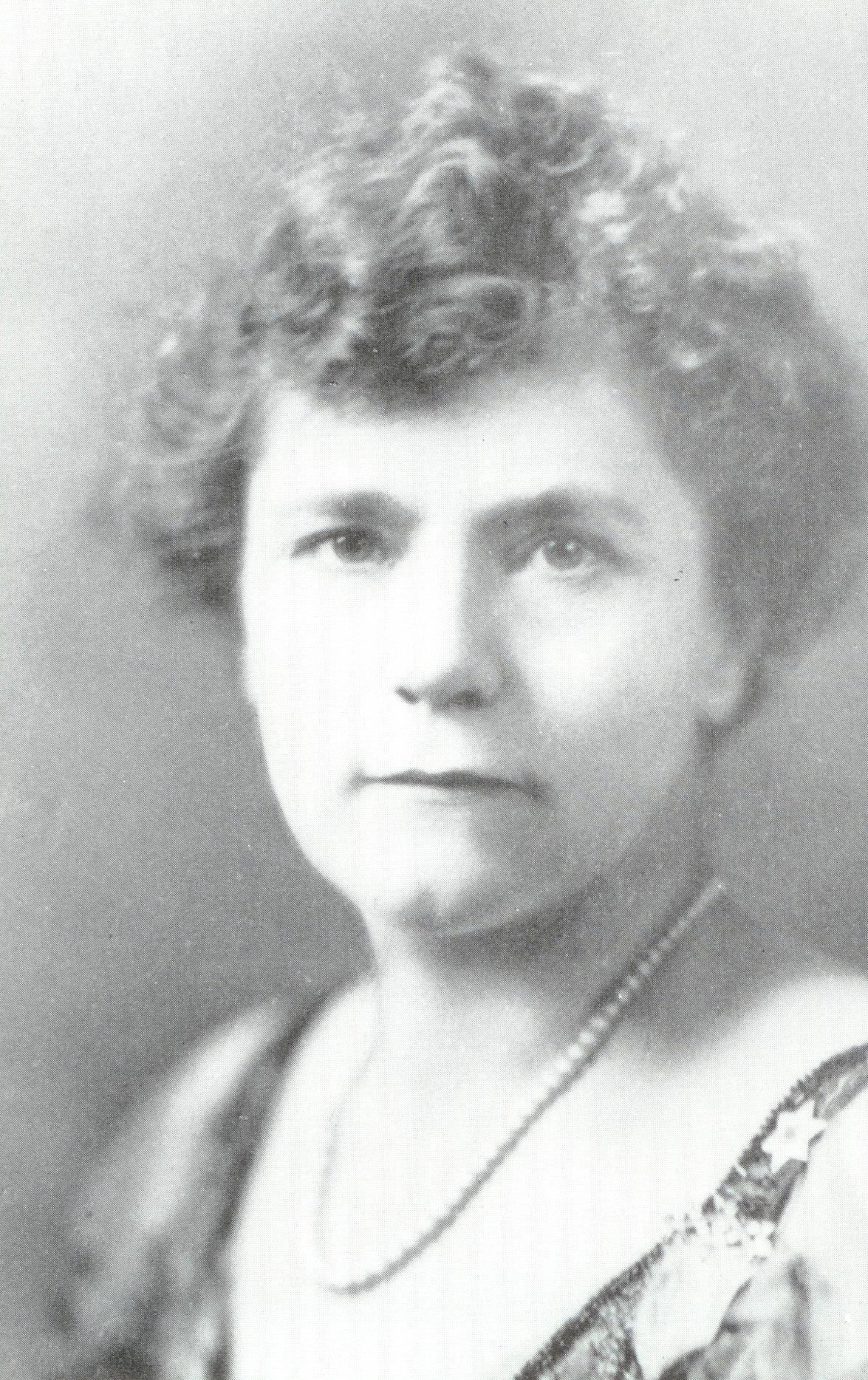
Sallie Foster Harshbarger

Sallie Foster Harshbarger (February 23, 1874 – April 17, 1958) was California State Regent of the Daughters of the American Revolution.

== Early life ==
Sallie Foster was born in Reno, Nevada, on February 23, 1874, the daughter of Asa Eastman Foster and Sophia Steele.

== Career ==
Sallie Foster Harshbarger was active in civic and fraternal work.

In 1915 she was Regent of the Tamalpais Chapter of the Daughters of the American Revolution in San Francisco and from 1920 to 1922, she was State Regent. She was member of the National Officers Club of the Daughters of the American Revolution.

In 1913 she was Worthy Matron of the Golden Gate No. 1 of the Order of the Eastern Star.

She was member of Daughters of Founders and Patriots of America and Colonial Dames of America.

== Personal life ==
Sallie Foster Harshbarger moved to California in 1898. She married Oswald H. Harshbarger and had two children, Asa Foster and Virginia La Forge. She lived at 269 Mather St., Oakland, California.

She died on April 17, 1958, and was buried in Klamath Falls, Oregon.
