= Camp Cuba Libre =

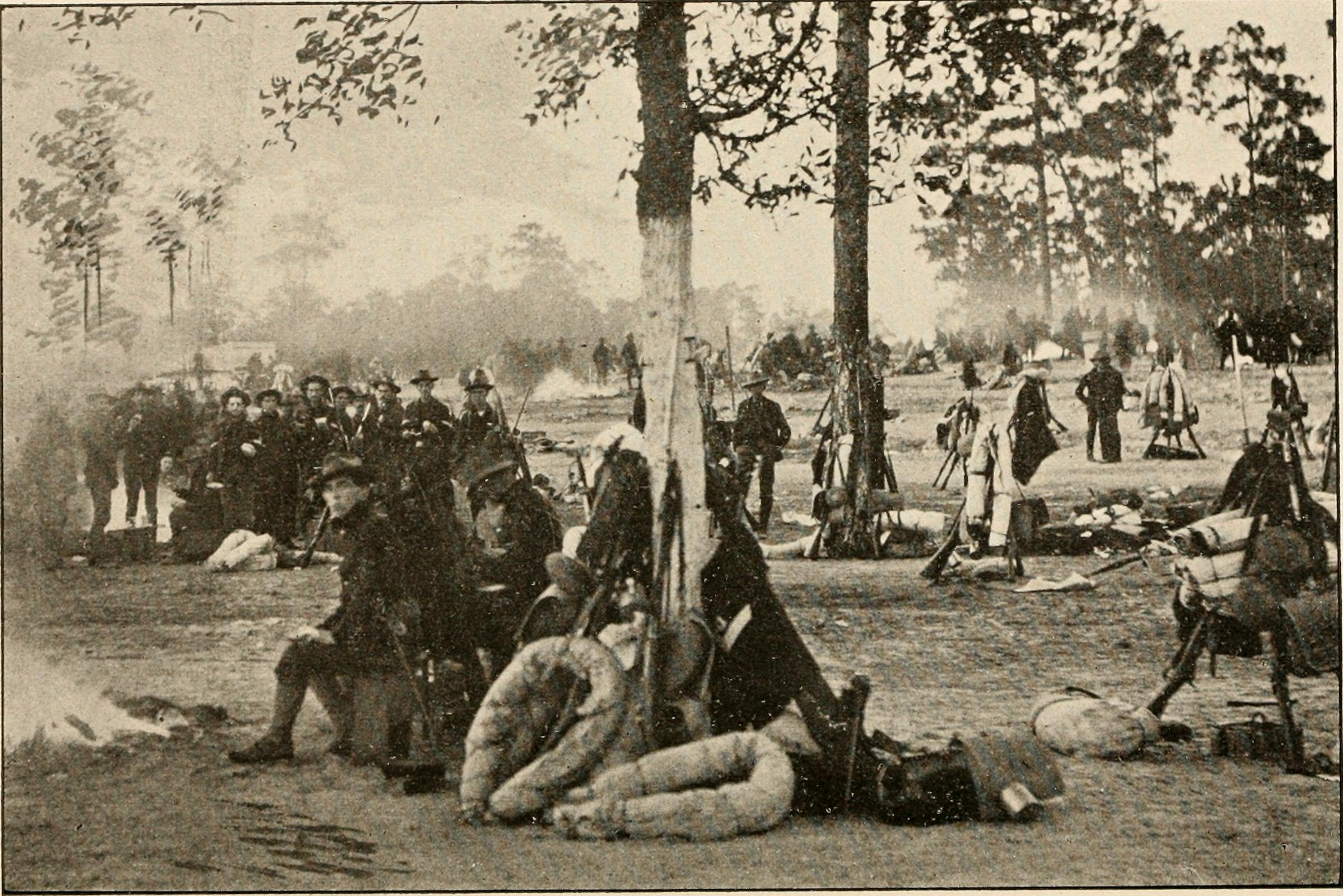
WAITING FOR THE TRAIN—CAMP-BREAKING AT CAMP CUBA LIBRE

Camp Cuba Libre was a rallying point for American forces during the Spanish–American War. Established in Jacksonville, Florida, in May 1898, it was constructed after forces assembling in Tampa became too crowded, and was the rallying point for Maj. General Fitzhugh Lee's Seventh Corps.

== Early 1898 ==
The camp was originally known as Camp Springfield, taking the name of the area north of downtown Jacksonville. The boundaries of the camp were set by "Ionia Street on the east, 8th street on the north, Main Street on the west, and 1st street on the south." The camp saw its greatest activity as the rallying point for the 30,000 men of the Seventh Corps shortly after its construction. As an overflow camp, supplies were scarce, and resources were being directed towards the Fifth and Eighth Corps, which were being deployed to the Philippines and Cuba.

== Women at Camp Cuba Libre ==
The Spanish–American War was one of the first wars in which nurses were used in an institutional capacity. The DAR Hospital Corps contracted four Catholic Lakota nuns as nurses who were sent to Camp Cuba Libre, before being assigned to Camp Columbia in Havana.

White female nurses from the north who were serving with the Red Cross reported the suspicion with which they were received at Cuba Libre by the chief surgeon, who questioned the need for his staff to be aided by female nurses, channeling the suspicion that women volunteering for intimate contact with male soldiers were "camp followers" (a euphemistic term for prostitutes who opportunistically followed armies). To counter this perception, Chief Nurse Edna Copeland instituted "strict sexual surveillance" on her nurses, which seemed to prompt accusations of misconduct by the women at one another.
