= Grace Lincoln Hall Brosseau =

13th President General of the Daughters of the American Revolution

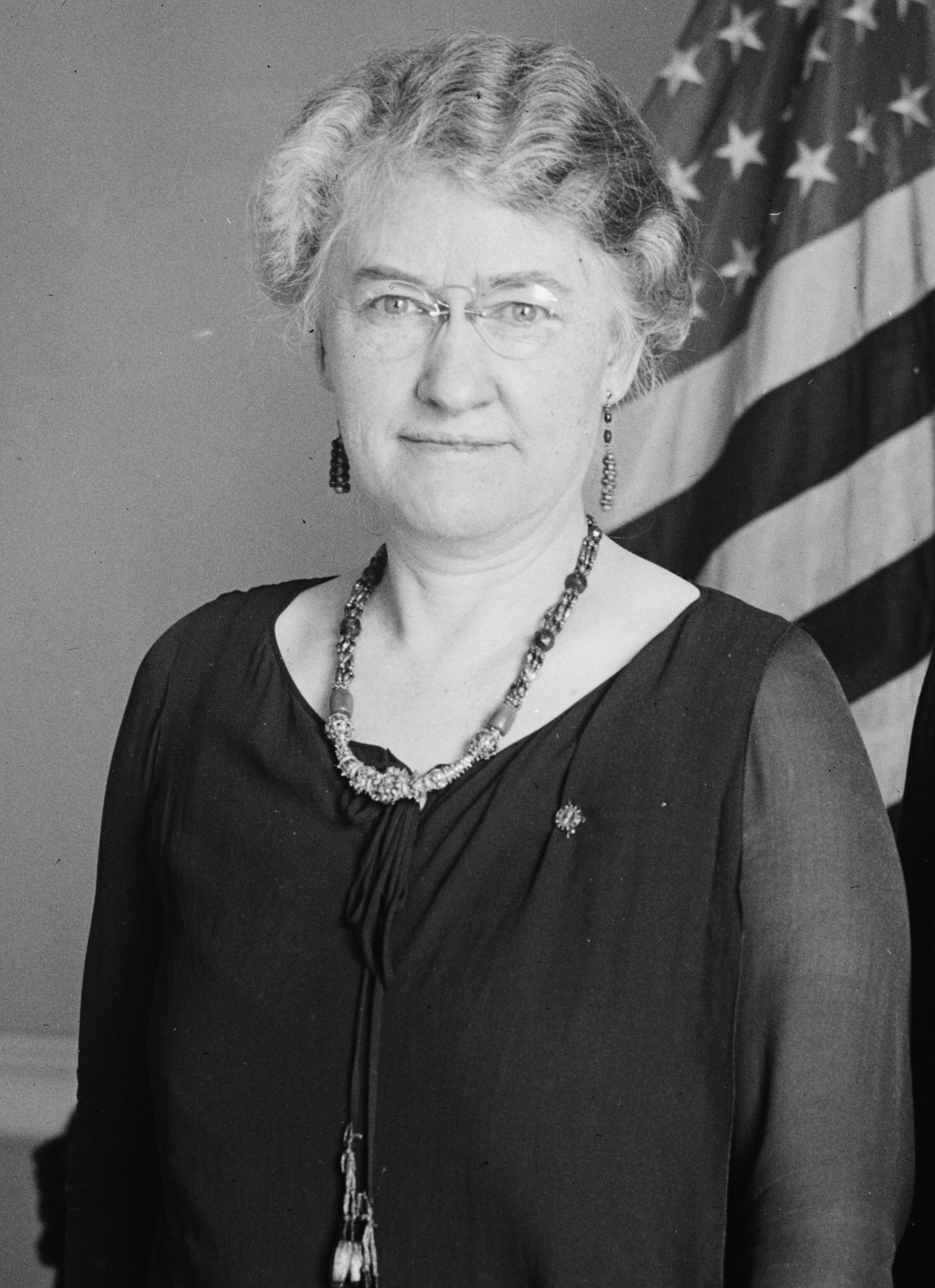
- Brosseau in 1927

13th President General of the National Society Daughters of the American Revolution
- In office 1926–1929
- Preceded by: Lora Haines Cook
- Succeeded by: Edith Irwin Hobart

Personal details
- Born: Grace Lincoln Hall; December 6, 1872 Moline, Illinois, U.S.
- Died: April 20, 1959 (aged 86) Greenwich, Connecticut, U.S.
- Resting place: Putnam Cemetery
- Spouse: Alfred J. Brosseau (1899–1930; divorced)
- Occupation: journalist, writer

Grace Lincoln Hall Brosseau (December 6, 1872 – April 20, 1959), also known as Mrs. Alfred J. Brosseau, was an American writer, journalist, and socialite who served as the 13th president general of the National Society Daughters of the American Revolution from 1926 to 1929.

== Early life ==
Brosseau was born Grace Lincoln Hall on December 6, 1872 in Moline, Illinois to Joseph M. Hall and Mary Olivia Pray Hall. She studied at the Davenport Business College in Davenport, Iowa.

== Career ==
After completing school, Brosseau worked as a journalist for a local newspaper and later wrote stories and special articles for magazines.

=== Daughters of the American Revolution ===
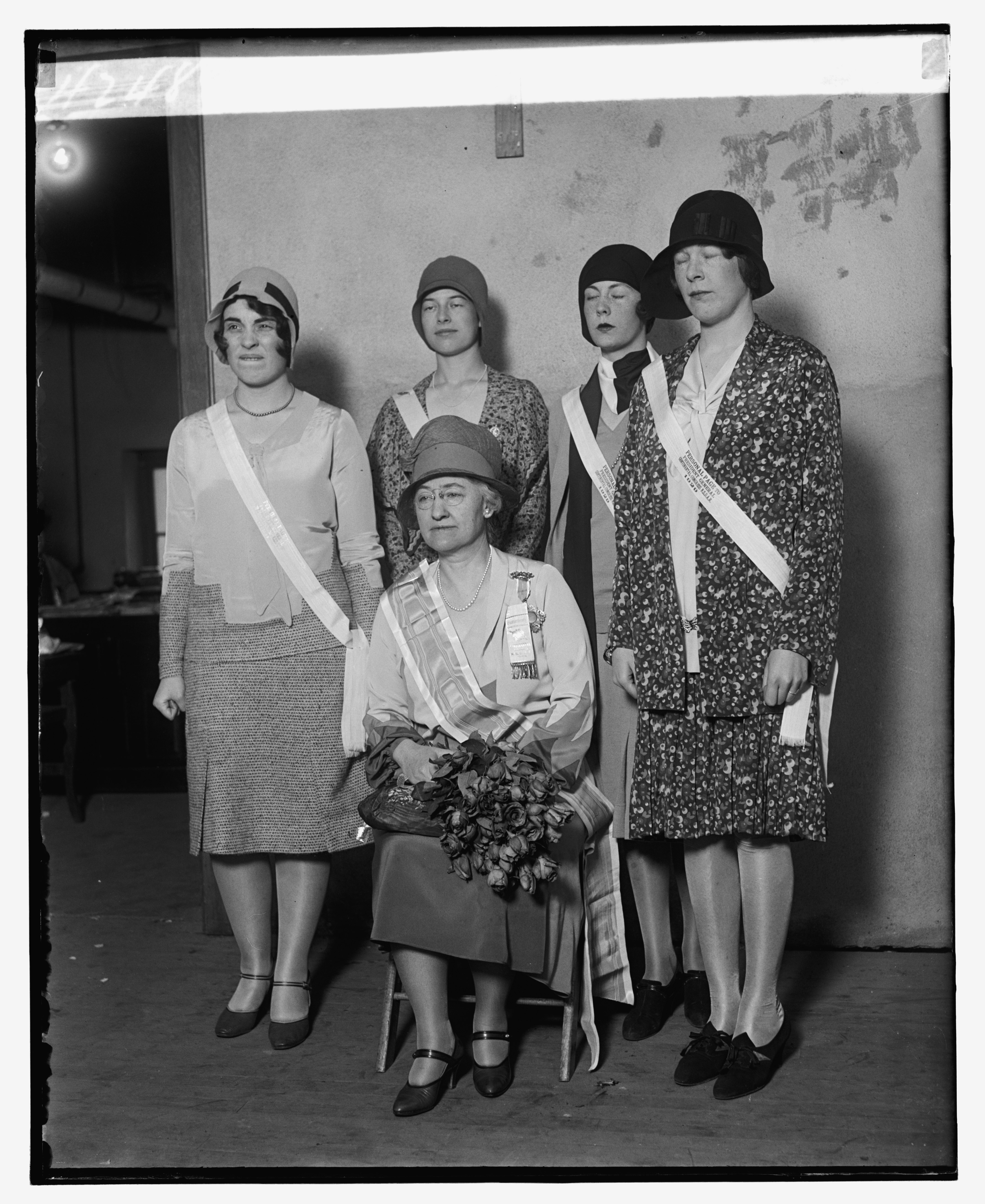
Brosseau (center) with her personal pages at the NSDAR Continental Congress in 1929.

Brosseau joined the Mary Little Deere Chapter of the Daughters of the American Revolution in 1895. She organized the Hannah Tracy Grant Chapter and served as its regent. In 1915, she was elected as the State Recording Secretary.

She was appointed by President General Anne Rogers Minor as the Chairwoman of the Ellis Island Committee, focused on improving the conditions of the Ellis Island Immigrant Station. During the Minor administration, Brosseau also served as Chairwoman of the Transportation Committee. In 1923, she was elected Treasurer General.

Brosseau (left) with Mrs. Rhett Goode, Chairman of the Program Committee, in 1927.

Brosseau served as President General of the Daughters of the American Revolution from April 1926 to April 1929. During her presidency, she defended the creation of a "blacklist" of certain speakers by the Massachusetts Society DAR and referred to DAR members who protested the blacklist as "only a few pacifists within our organization who oppose our support of the navy bill." In June 1928, Helen Tufts Bailie was expelled from the DAR for publishing a pamphlet called Our Threatened Heritage, which openly protested the blacklist. She appealed her expulsion but only received one dissenting vote from the congress, over which Brosseau presided.

During her presidency, the national society erected the twelve Madonna of the Trail monuments along the National Old Trails Road. Also during her administration, the Daughters of the American Revolution dedicated a memorial to its four founders, Mary Smith Lockwood, Mary Desha, Ellen Hardin Walworth, and Eugenia Washington, with a sculpture by Gertrude Vanderbilt Whitney at DAR Constitution Hall.

== Personal life ==
Brosseau married Alfred Joseph Brosseau, an automobile businessman, on December 20, 1899. Her husband was the president of the Mack Motor Trucking Company, vice president of the National Automobile Chamber of Commerce, and director of the United States Chamber of Commerce. They moved to Kansas City in 1907. They later moved to New York City and then Connecticut. She obtained an uncontested divorce from her husband on October 4, 1930 on the grounds of "intolerable cruelty." Following a hearing in the Connecticut Superior Court, in which Brosseau testified that her husband physically assaulted her and witness testimony was given by Mrs. Wilson Felder, Judge Anthony C. Baldwin granted the divorce. A financial settlement was reached out of court.

She died on April 20, 1959. She was buried in Putnam Cemetery.
