= National Society of Daughters of Founders and Patriots of America =

American lineage society

- Abbreviation: NSDFPA
- Established: June 7, 1898; 128 years ago
- Founders: Eugenia Washington; Mrs. Henry V. Boynton; Mrs. William L. Mason
- Type: lineage society
- Website: nationalsocietydfpa.com

The National Society of Daughters of Founders and Patriots of America (often abbreviated as NSDFPA) is a lineage society for women who directly descend from an American colonist who arrived in the colonies between May 13, 1607, and May 13, 1687, and who directly descend from a patriot of the American Revolution.

== History ==
The National Society of Daughters of Founders and Patriots of America was founded on June 7, 1898, by Eugenia Washington, a great-grandniece of George Washington who previously co-founded the Daughters of the American Revolution in 1890, Mrs. Henry V. Boynton, and Mrs. William L. Mason. Washington established the lineage society as a means to preserve Colonial American history, foster patriotism, and encourage appreciation for American history. She wanted to avoid "bickering" among a large number of members, which she experienced in the Daughters of the American Revolution, and decided that this national society would "remain small and cordial" by excluding membership only to women who were direct descendants of a colonist who arrived in America between May 13, 1607, and May 13, 1687, and that they also meet the membership qualifications for the Daughters of the American Revolution.

Up until 1975, the society published thirty-four volumes of lineage records of its members, which were made availablle at many libraries. In 1975, the national society consolidated all records into one volume and published an index to its lineage records.

Washington intended for the society to not surpass 300 members but, by the 1980s, there were over 2,800 members.

== Notable members ==
- Jeannette Osborn Baylies (1912–1984), lineage society leader
- Margaret Ann Scruggs Carruth (1892–1988), etcher, printmaker, illustrator and educator
- Mildred Adams Fenton (1899–1995), paleontologist and geologist
- Grace Gemberling (1903–1997), painter
- Sallie Foster Harshbarger (1874–1958), lineage society leader
- Frances Adelaide Leverich Ingraham (died 1934), lineage society leader
- Maria Purdy Peck (1840–1914), essayist and social economist
- Sarah Corbin Robert (1886–1972), lineage society leader
- Betty Newkirk Seimes, lineage society leader
- Eugenia Washington (1838–1900), historian, civil servant, and lineage society leader
- Jeanne Fox Weinmann (1874–1962), lineage society leader
- Edith Wire (1899–1973), composer and pianist
- Kathryn Slaughter Wittichen (1896–1985), clubwoman and lineage society leader
- Merry Ann Thompson Wright (1943–2022), lineage society leader

== See also ==
- Order of the Founders and Patriots of America
- Daughters of the American Revolution
- National Society Daughters of the American Colonists
- Colonial Dames of America
- National Society of the Colonial Dames of America
- National Society Colonial Dames XVII Century
