= Mary Smith Lockwood =

American civic leader and writer (1831–1922)

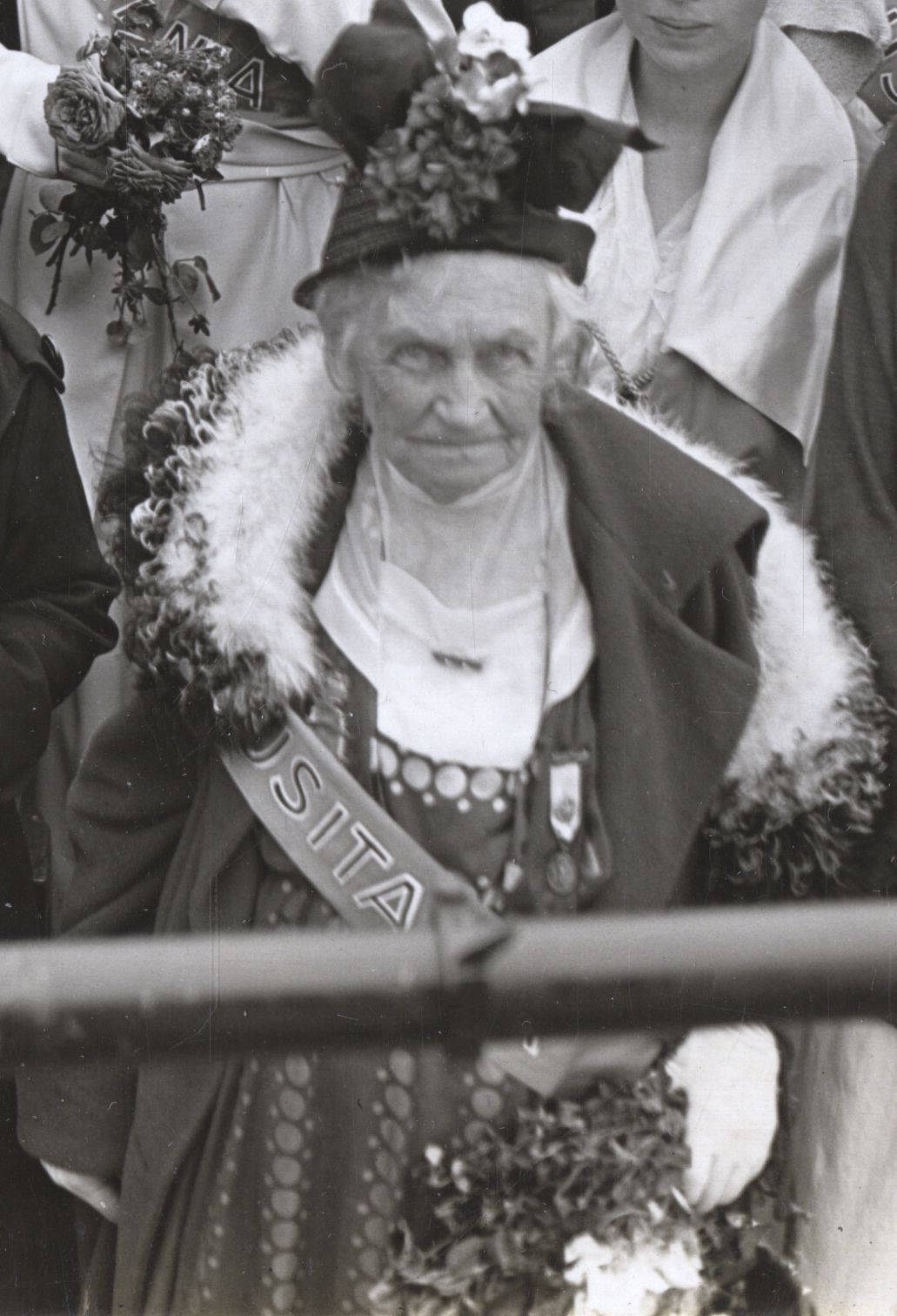
- Lockwood in 1918
- Born: Mary Smith; October 24, 1831; Hanover, New York, U.S.
- Died: November 9, 1922 (aged 91); Plymouth, Massachusetts, U.S.
- Resting place: Glenwood Cemetery; Washington, D.C., U.S.
- Occupations: Clubwoman; Suffragist; Writer
- Spouse: Henry C. Lockwood
- Children: 2

Mary Smith Lockwood (October 24, 1831 – November 9, 1922) was an American suffragist, writer, and clubwoman who was one of the founders of the Daughters of the American Revolution (DAR). She was the DAR's first historian general and was editor of the Daughters of the American Revolution Magazine. Lockwood also served as president of the Woman's National Press Association and as Lady Manager at Large for the World's Columbian Exposition.

== Life and family ==
Mary Smith was born on October 24, 1831, in Hanover, New York, the daughter of Beulah Blodgett and Henry Smith, and distantly related to the founders of Smith College. Her father and grandfather fought in the War of 1812 and her great-grandfather, Martin Roberts, fought in the American Revolutionary War. She married Henry C. Lockwood on 15 September 1851, at the age of 19. They had two children: Rodney and Lillian, both of whom proceeded her in death.

Lockwood died on November 9, 1922, in Plymouth, Massachusetts, and was the last surviving founder of the Daughters of the American Revolution, as well as the only founder buried in Washington, D.C.

== Club woman ==
She was a Club woman, a role that allowed women of her time to take an active role in the public sphere at a time when social roles were strictly divided by gender. She was the founder of the Travel Club, President of the Woman's National Press Association (WNPA), Lady Manager at Large at the World's Columbian Exposition in Chicago in 1893, President of the District Federation of Women's Clubs, member of the American Historical Association, served on the advisory council of the Federal Women's Equality Association, vice-president of the Woman's National Republican Association, and Woman's Relief Corps. She is best known for her role in the founding of the Daughters of the American Revolution.

=== Woman's suffrage ===
Lockwood was a suffragist, advocating for the right for women to vote in the United States. She was active with the National Woman Suffrage Association, serving on a finance committee in 1888. She was a member of the Federal Suffrage Association, serving on its Advisory Council by 1914.

When asked about her interest in women's suffrage, she said: "I never gave the subject of suffrage for women a thought while I had a husband or father, but when thrown upon my own resources, and found I could not get a lease on property without first engaging a responsible man to stand sponsor for it, or sell my own property without putting it into the hands of trustees, my eyes were opened. It is the women who are not brought into conflict with the actualities of life, and are cared for by husbands or fathers, who, without reflection up the subject, are as a rule the opponents of woman suffrage."

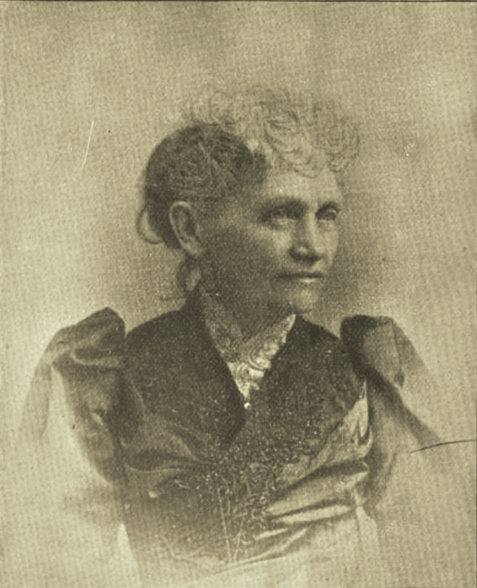
The New England Magazine, 1892

=== Daughters of the American Revolution ===
On July 13, 1890, after the Sons of the American Revolution refused to allow women to join their group, Lockwood published the story of patriot Hannah White Arnett in The Washington Post, ending her piece with the question, "Where will the Sons and Daughters of the American Revolution place Hannah Arnett?" On July 21 of that year, William O. McDowell, a great-grandson of Hannah White Arnett, published an article in The Washington Post offering to help form a society to be known as the Daughters of the American Revolution. The first meeting of the society was held August 9, 1890.

The Daughters of the American Revolution was officially founded on October 11, 1890, at 2 p.m. at the Strathmore Arms, the home of Lockwood, who was one of its four co-founders. Sons of the American Revolution members Registrar General Dr. George Brown Goode, Secretary General A. Howard Clark, William O. McDowell (SAR member #1), Wilson L. Gill (secretary at the inaugural meeting), and 18 other people met at the Strathmore Arms that day, but Lockwood, Eugenia Washington, Mary Desha, and Ellen Hardin Walworth are called co-founders since they held two to three meetings in August 1890.

Lockwood was also the Daughters of the American Revolution's first historian, and served as editor of the Daughters of the American Revolution Magazine from 1894 to 1900. The Daughters of the American Revolution was inspired by her to resolve on October 18, 1890, to "provide a place for the collection of Historical relics which will accumulate…and for historical portraits, pictures, etc. This may first be in rooms, and later in the erection of a fire-proof building."

In 1912 she spoke out publicly against the usage of the DAR's Memorial Continental Hall for a United Daughters of the Confederacy convention, and the posting of Confederate flags in the building. Lockwood called the event an "invasion of the women who once followed a rebellious flag."

=== Ruffin incident ===
At the 1900 biennial meeting of the Federation of Women's Club meeting in June 1900, Josephine St. Pierre Ruffin, a Black woman, was denied credentials as a member of a Black club. Lockwood became publicly involved with the resulting public debate. As Secretary of the Federation, she published an editorial in the Washington Post that defended the actions of the convention. She acknowledged that the Women's Era Club (also referred to as the New Era Club) was excluded, but claimed that it was done, in part, because Black club women did not want to integrate and "be dominated" by white clubs. Ruffin and other responded in editorials of their own, with Ruffin calling Lockwood's statements "interesting and amusing... distorted point of view."

== Writing career ==
Lockwood wrote many books, the most notable being Historic Homes of Washington and Hand Book of Ceramic Art, as well as articles for newspapers and journals. She joined the Woman's National Press Association (WNPA) and was serving as its president when she died.

Lockwood was a friend and advisor to women's rights activists Susan B. Anthony and Elizabeth Cady Stanton, and wrote in newspapers about women's rights.

=== Works ===
- Hand-book of ceramic art (1878)
- Art embroidery (1878)
- Historic homes in Washington; its noted men and women (1889)
- The Woman's Building and what is to be seen in it : guidebook (1893)
- Columbia guide to historic and modern Washington (1897)
- Story of the records, D.A.R. (1906)
- Chronicles of the Scotch-Irish settlement in Virginia (1912)
- Yesterdays in Washington, Vol 1 (1915)
- Yesterdays in Washington, Vol 2 (1915)
- Afoot and wheel in Europe (1916)

== Politics and beliefs ==
Lockwood's father was a Republican, influencing Lockwood's political beliefs from a young age. She joined a Republican Women's Club in 1880 and in 1901 was serving as vice-president of the Woman's National Republican Association. In her biographical sketch of Abraham Lincoln, part of a series she wrote for The National Tribune, she described him as "the grand, heroic figure, the center of all hope, and toward him were turned the eyes and hearts of all who loved their country." Her support of the Union and the United States Government including speaking out against the United Daughters of the Confederacy.

Lockwood supported the Nationalistic ideology of the era, wary of immigrants from Southern and Eastern Europe. In 1894, in her role as History General of the DAR, she wrote that "there is danger ahead! Our country is being denationalized by Hungarians, Poles, and Italians, who have never read the first letter of the spirit of Americanism."

== Legacy ==
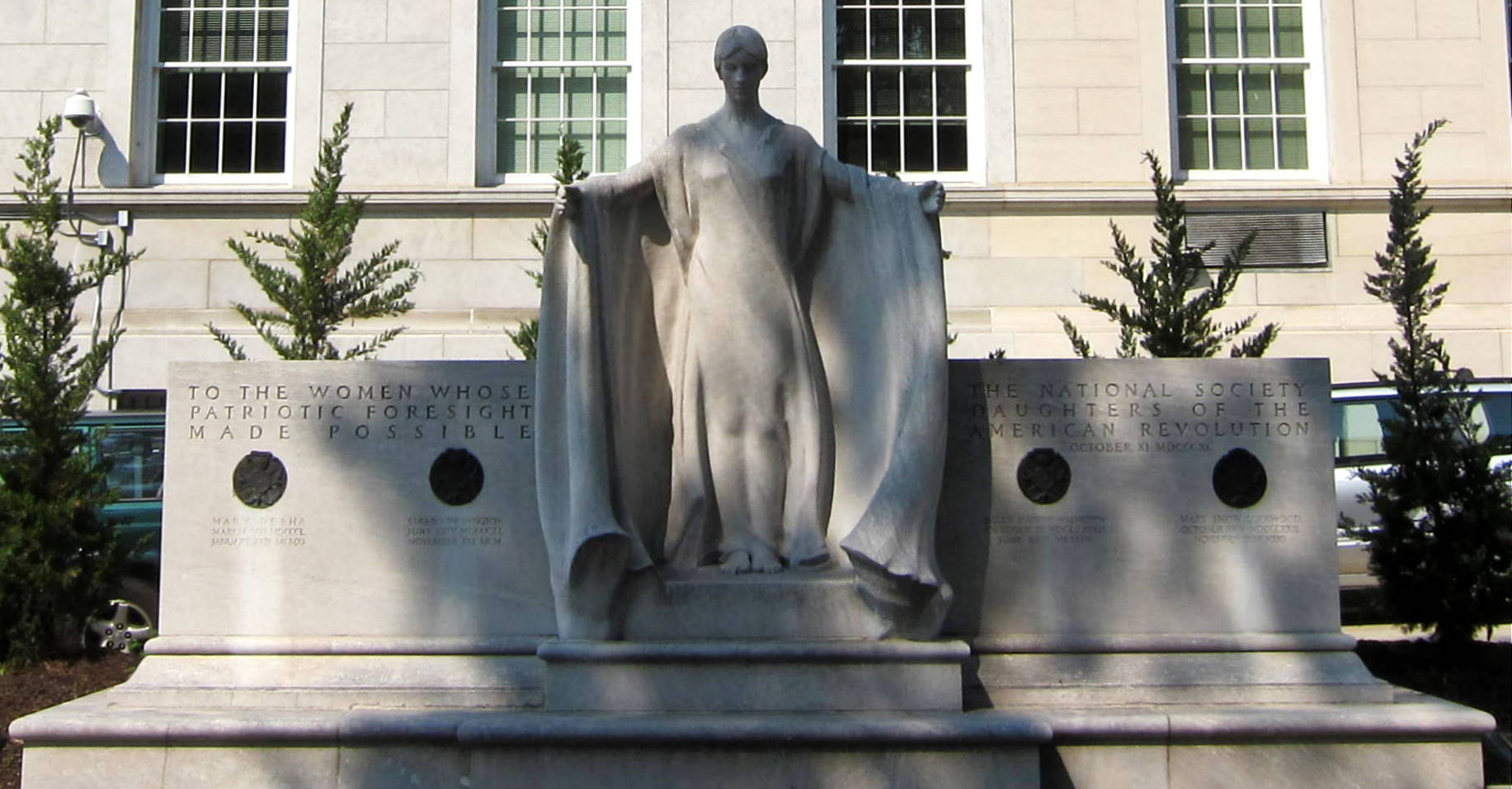
The founders of the Daughters of the American Revolution honor Lockwood and the other co-founders of the DAR.

On April 17, 1929, under the leadership of President General Grace L. H. Brosseau, the Daughters of the American Revolution dedicated a memorial to its four founders, including Lockwood. The memorial was sculpted by Gertrude Vanderbilt Whitney, who was a member of the Daughters of the American Revolution, and is located at Constitution Hall in Washington, D.C.

A memorial to Lockwood was dedicated in 1940 at the four corners in Smith Mills, New York, consisting of a large native boulder with a bronze tablet inset, stating, "Birthplace of Mary Smith Lockwood 1831-1922, Pen Founder of the National Society of the Daughters of the American Revolution. Erected by Benjamin Prescott, Ellicott, Jamestown, Major Benjamin Bosworth and Patterson Chapters, 1940." (However, according to the Daughters of the American Revolution, Lockwood was actually born in Hanover, New York.)

The Mary Smith Lockwood Founders Medal for Education is awarded by the Daughters of the American Revolution.
