= American Monthly =

American magazine published by the Daughters of the American Revolution

- Frequency: Monthly
- Founder: Ellen Hardin Walworth
- Founded: 1892
- Final issue: 2001
- Country: United States
- Based in: Washington, D.C.

American Monthly magazine was the original official monthly magazine published by the National Society of the Daughters of the American Revolution (NSDAR). The magazine was published between 1892 and 2001.

== History and profile ==
The magazine was established in 1892 with the name The American Monthly. The headquarters of the magazine was in Washington DC. In 1913 it was renamed as Daughters of the American Revolution Magazine.

Later titles were Daughters of the American Revolution Magazine, and The National Historical Magazine. In 2001, under the administration of President General Linda Tinker Watkins, the NSDAR split the content into two magazines, a new periodical called American Spirit, containing "articles pertaining to American history, historic preservation, patriotism, genealogy and education", and Daughters of the American Revolution Newsletter, a newsletter covering members' concerns from national headquarters.

Ellen Hardin Walworth, one of the original four founders of the DAR, was the initial editor of the magazine. She was the periodical's editor from the spring of 1892 until July 1894. Her successor was fellow DAR founder Mary Smith Lockwood. Catharine Hitchcock Tilden Avery later served in that role.
