= Martin D. Hardin =

American politician (1780–1823)

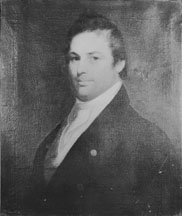

United States Senator from Kentucky
- In office November 13, 1816 – March 4, 1817
- Preceded by: William T. Barry
- Succeeded by: John J. Crittenden

8th & 10th Secretary of State of Kentucky
- In office March 13, 1813 – September 4, 1816
- Governor: Isaac Shelby
- Preceded by: Christopher Greenup
- Succeeded by: Charles Stewart Todd
- In office September 1, 1812 – December 15, 1812
- Governor: Isaac Shelby
- Preceded by: Fielding Whitlock
- Succeeded by: Christopher Greenup

Member of the Kentucky House of Representatives
- In office 1805-1806; 1812; 1818-1820

Personal details
- Born: June 21, 1780 Monongahela River, Pennsylvania
- Died: October 8, 1823 (aged 43) Frankfort, Kentucky
- Resting place: Frankfort Cemetery
- Party: Democratic-Republican
- Spouse: Elizabeth Logan
- Relations: Son of John Hardin; Cousin of Benjamin Hardin; Cousin of Charles A. Wickliffe
- Children: John J. Hardin
- Education: Transylvania Seminary
- Profession: Lawyer

Military service
- Allegiance: United States
- Branch/service: Kentucky militia
- Rank: Major
- Unit: First Rifle Regiment, Kentucky Militia
- Battles/wars: War of 1812: Battle of the River Raisin

Martin D. Hardin (June 21, 1780 – October 8, 1823) was a politician and lawyer from Kentucky. Born in Pennsylvania, his family migrated to Kentucky when he was still young. He studied law under George Nicholas and commenced practice at Richmond, Kentucky. His cousin, future U.S. Representative Benjamin Hardin, studied in his law office. He represented Madison County in the Kentucky House of Representatives for a single term.

Hardin later moved to Frankfort and was elected to the Kentucky House to represent Franklin County. Governor Isaac Shelby appointed him Secretary of State soon after his election. Concurrent with his service, he participated in the War of 1812, serving alongside future Kentucky Governor George Madison as majors in Colonel John Allen's militia unit. Following the expiration of his term as Secretary of State, Governor Gabriel Slaughter appointed Hardin to the U.S. Senate seat vacated by William T. Barry, who resigned. Hardin served the remainder of Barry's term – approximately one year – and did not seek re-election. In 1819, he was elected to the Kentucky House for a third time and was chosen Speaker of the House. He died October 8, 1823.

Hardin married the daughter of Kentucky pioneer Benjamin Logan, and their son, John J. Hardin, represented Illinois in the U.S. House of Representatives before being killed at the Battle of Buena Vista. In his book Life of Lincoln, Ward Hill Lamon speculated that future President Abraham Lincoln may have been the illegitimate child of Hardin and Nancy Hanks, but the rumor was later debunked.

== Early life and family ==
Hardin was born June 21, 1780, along the Monongahela River in western Pennsylvania. He was the eldest son of Colonel John and Jane (Davies) Hardin. Named for his grandfather, he adopted the middle initial "D." to distinguish between them. The Hardin family moved to Kentucky in April 1786, settling near the present-day city of Springfield in Washington (then Nelson) County.

Hardin matriculated to Transylvania Seminary (now Transylvania University) in Lexington, Kentucky. Afterward, he read law with George Nicholas. He was admitted to the bar in 1801 and commenced practice in Richmond, Kentucky. He owned slaves. Among those who read law in his office were his cousin, U.S. Representative Benjamin Hardin; and future Kentucky Governor and Postmaster General Charles A. Wickliffe. Although he was not particularly politically ambitious, Hardin was elected to represent Madison County in the Kentucky House of Representatives in 1805, serving a single term. He was chosen clerk of the Kentucky Court of Appeals in 1808. In 1810, he published Reports of Cases Argued and Adjudged in the Court of Appeals of Kentucky, covering the proceedings of the court between the years of 1805 and 1808.

On January 20, 1809, he married Elizabeth Logan, daughter of famed Kentucky pioneer Benjamin Logan. Their eldest son, John J. Hardin, represented Illinois in the U.S. House of Representatives and was killed in the Battle of Buena Vista during the Mexican–American War.

In his work Life of Lincoln, Ward Hill Lamon promoted the notion that Abraham Lincoln was an illegitimate child of Nancy Hanks; Hardin was proffered as Lincoln's potential father. In a 1920 essay, William Barton opines that Hardin's paternity was unlikely since both he and Hanks were married at the time, and because Hardin's usual travels – to his law practice in Richmond and to state business in Frankfort – took him in the opposite direction of Nancy Hanks-Lincoln's house. The rumor arose from an inability to locate Thomas Lincoln and Nancy Hanks' marriage license at the courthouse in Hardin County, Kentucky; the license was later found in the courthouse in Washington County, effectively discrediting the rumor.

== Political career ==
Politically, Hardin favored the construction of internal improvements at federal expense and adhered to a loose interpretation of the U.S. Constitution. His entry in the 1936 Dictionary of American Biography notes that, while some of his fellow Kentuckians believed he was a Federalist, Hardin was actually a national Democrat who probably would have associated with the Whig Party had he lived long enough to see its formation.

In April 1812, as the War of 1812 became more imminent, Hardin wrote to Isaac Shelby, Kentucky's first governor and a hero of the Revolutionary War, asking him to consent to being a candidate in the upcoming gubernatorial election. Shelby went on to win the election, and Hardin, who had by this time relocated to Frankfort, was elected to represent Franklin County in the Kentucky House. In August 1812, shortly after the election, Shelby appointed Hardin Secretary of State. According to Shelby's executive journal, Hardin resigned on or before February 3, 1813. The next day, Shelby nominated Hardin's assistant, former Governor Christopher Greenup, to replace him. Greenup served only a month, resigning on March 11, 1813, after which Hardin was re-appointed and served for the remainder of Shelby's term.

Hardin volunteered for service in the War of 1812. He was one of two majors serving under John Allen; future Kentucky Governor George Madison was the other. Hardin's unit pursued Tecumseh through northern Ohio and Michigan and participated in the Battle of the River Raisin.

On November 13, 1816, Governor Gabriel Slaughter appointed Hardin to the U.S. Senate seat vacated when William T. Barry resigned. The appointment was only effective until the General Assembly convened later that year. When the Kentucky Senate convened, the senators elected him to serve out the remainder of Barry's term. Hardin did not seek re-election at the expiration of the term. In total, he served from November 13, 1816, to March 3, 1817.

In 1818, Hardin returned to the Kentucky House, serving until 1820 and acting as Speaker of the House from 1819 to 1820.

== Later life and death ==
In December 1820, Hardin was a candidate to become president of the Bank of Kentucky, but John Harvie was chosen instead. The following year, he was chosen as a member of the Electoral College, voting for James Monroe.

Hardin died in Frankfort in 1823, and was interred on his farm in Franklin County, Kentucky. His remains were later re-interred in the State Cemetery in Frankfort.

Political offices
Preceded by Fielding Whitlock	Secretary of State of Kentucky; 1812	Succeeded by Christopher Greenup
Preceded by Christopher Greenup	Secretary of State of Kentucky; 1813–1816	Succeeded by Charles Stewart Todd
U.S. Senate
Preceded by William T. Barry	U.S. senator (Class 2) from Kentucky; 1816–1817; Served alongside: Isham Talbot	Succeeded by John J. Crittenden
