= John J. Hardin =

American soldier and politician (1810–1847)

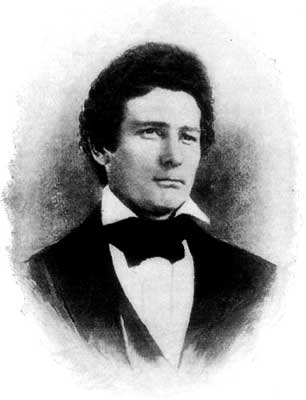

Member of the U.S. House of Representatives from Illinois's 7th district
- In office March 4, 1843 – March 3, 1845
- Preceded by: District created
- Succeeded by: Edward D. Baker

Personal details
- Born: January 6, 1810 Frankfort, Kentucky, U.S.
- Died: February 23, 1847 (aged 37) Saltillo, Coahuila, Mexico
- Party: Whig
- Spouse: Sarah Ellen Smith
- Children: Ellen Hardin Walworth; Martin Davis Hardin
- Parent: Martin D. Hardin (father)
- Occupation: Politician • Soldier

Military service
- Allegiance: United States
- Branch/service: Illinois Militia
- Rank: Brigadier general
- Battles/wars: Black Hawk War; Illinois Mormon War; Mexican–American War; Battle of Buena Vista †

John Jay Hardin (January 6, 1810 – February 23, 1847) was a U.S. representative and militia general from Illinois.

== Biography ==
Born in Frankfort, Kentucky, the son of Martin D. Hardin, Hardin pursued classical studies and graduated from Transylvania University, Lexington, Kentucky, where he studied law. He was admitted to the bar in Kentucky in 1831 and commenced practice in Jacksonville, Illinois. He served in the Illinois Militia during the Black Hawk War of 1832. He was brigadier general in command during the Illinois Mormon War in Hancock County, Illinois, in 1844. He later attained the rank of major general. He was appointed prosecuting attorney of Morgan County in 1832. He served as member of the Illinois House of Representatives 1836–1842. His daughter, Ellen Hardin Walworth, was born in 1832. His son, Martin Davis Hardin, was born in 1837.

He was co-editor/founder of the Illinoisan newspaper in Jacksonville in 1837. He was credited with helping to avert a duel between Abraham Lincoln and State Auditor James Shields. In February 1844, Hardin was present on the USS Princeton when one of its guns exploded, and he helped manage the aftermath of the disaster, staying on the ship for nearly a week.

Hardin was elected as a Whig to the Twenty-eighth Congress (March 4, 1843 – March 3, 1845). Despite large popularity in his district, he was not a candidate for renomination in 1844. It has been suggested that Hardin's premature death helped Lincoln's rise to prominence in Illinois politics.

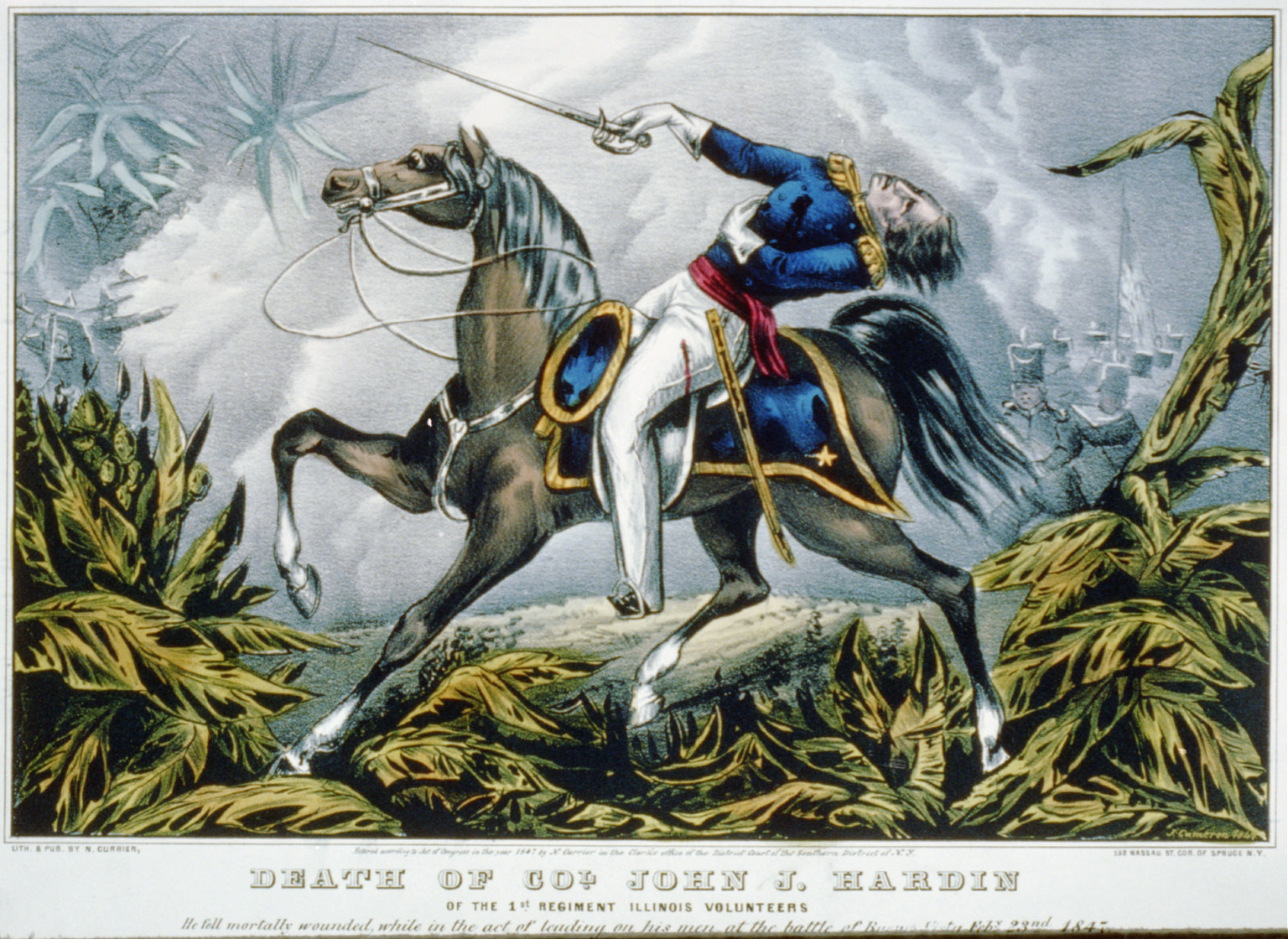
The death of Col. Hardin at the Battle of Buena Vista.

Despite being an unabashed Whig, Hardin was a fervent supporter of the Mexican–American War that was advocated by James K. Polk and many expansionist Democrats. During the war, he recruited the First Regiment, Illinois Volunteer Infantry, of which he was commissioned colonel. On February 23, 1847, he was killed at the Battle of Buena Vista, Mexico, after attempting to lead a charge against a Mexican battery. The outpouring of grief over his death was immense, and Hardin's funeral procession was attended by 15,000 people. He was interred in City Cemetery (East), Jacksonville, Illinois. Hardin County, Iowa, was named in honor of the Colonel and his legacy, as was the town of Hardin, Illinois.

== Notes ==
Attribution

U.S. House of Representatives
Preceded by District created	Member of the U.S. House of Representatives from Illinois's 7th congressional district March 4, 1843 – March 3, 1845	Succeeded by Edward D. Baker
