= Billy Mitchell =

United States Army general (1879–1936)

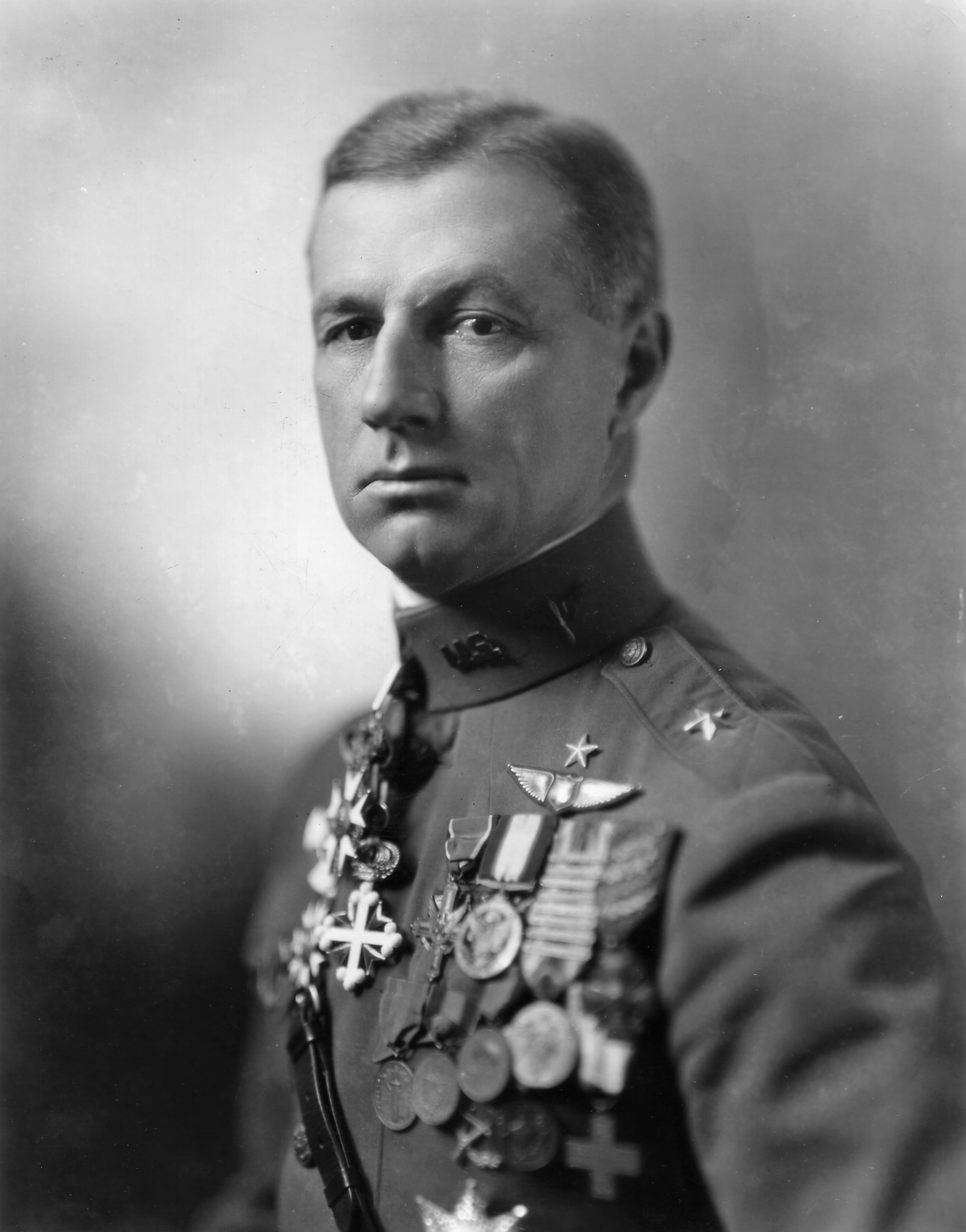
- Mitchell, c. 1920s
- Born: William Lendrum Mitchell; December 29, 1879; Nice, France
- Died: February 19, 1936 (aged 56); New York City, U.S.
- Burial place: Forest Home Cemetery, Milwaukee, Wisconsin
- Military career
- Allegiance: United States
- Branch: United States Army; Army Air Service
- Service years: 1898–1926
- Rank: Colonel (permanent); Brigadier General (temporary)
- Commands: Air Service, Third Army – AEF
- Conflicts: Spanish–American War; World War I; Battle of Saint-Mihiel; The Lost Battalion; West Virginia coal wars; Battle of Blair Mountain
- Awards: Distinguished Service Cross; Distinguished Service Medal; World War I Victory Medal; Congressional Gold Medal (posthumous)

William Lendrum Mitchell (December 29, 1879 – February 19, 1936) was a United States Army officer who had a major role in the creation of the United States Air Force.

Mitchell served in France during World War I and, by the conflict's end, commanded all American air combat units in that country. After the war, he was appointed deputy director of the Air Service and began advocating for increased investment in air power, believing that this would prove vital in future wars. He argued particularly for the ability of bombers to sink battleships and organized a series of bombing runs against stationary ships designed to test the idea.

He antagonized many administrative leaders of the Army with his arguments and criticism and in 1925, his temporary appointment as a brigadier general was not renewed, and he reverted to his permanent rank of colonel, due to his insubordination. Later that year, he was court-martialed for insubordination after accusing Army and Navy leaders of an "almost treasonable administration of the national defense" for investing in battleships. He resigned from the service shortly afterward.

Mitchell received many honors following his death, including a Congressional Gold Medal. He is also the first person for whom an American military aircraft design, the North American B-25 Mitchell, is named. Milwaukee Mitchell International Airport in Milwaukee, Wisconsin and the volcano Billy Mitchell in Papua New Guinea are also named after Mitchell.

== Early life ==
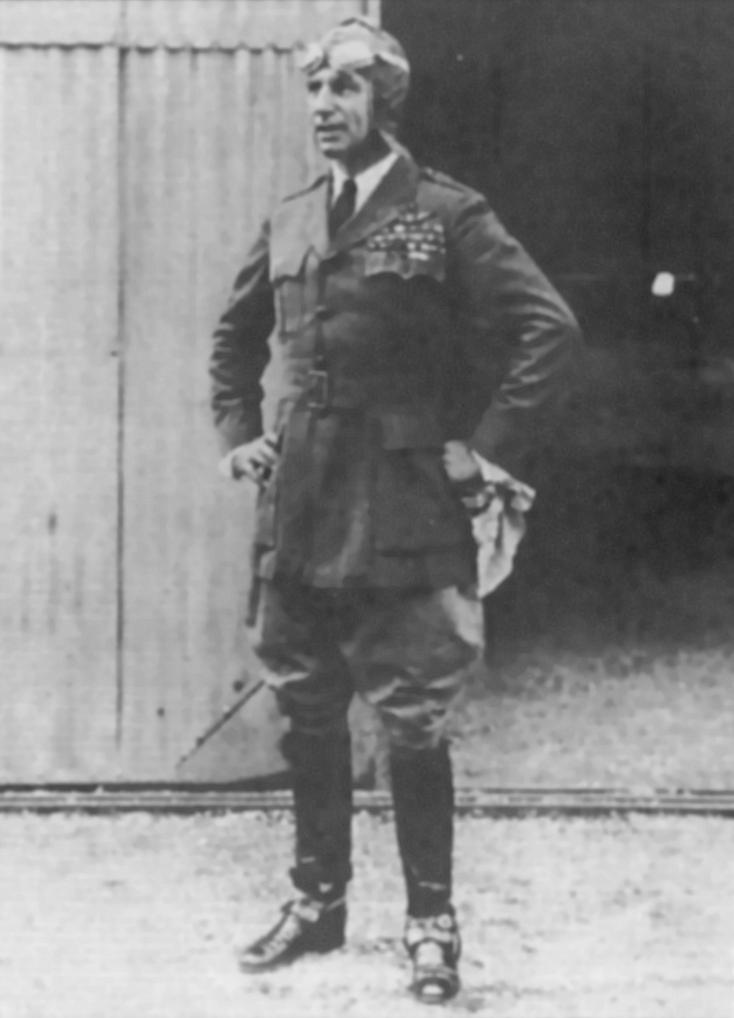
Mitchell as assistant chief of Air Service (in non-regulation uniform)

Mitchell was born in Nice, France, to John L. Mitchell, a wealthy Wisconsin senator, and his wife Harriet Danforth (Becker). He grew up on an estate in North Greenfield, Wisconsin, which is now the Milwaukee suburb of West Allis. Mitchell's father served in the American Civil War as a first lieutenant in the 24th Wisconsin Volunteer Infantry Regiment, along with future general Arthur MacArthur (the father of General Douglas MacArthur). The elder Mitchell served as a United States senator from 1883 to 1889.

Mitchell's paternal grandfather, Alexander Mitchell, a Scotsman, established what became the Milwaukee Road railroad and the Marine Bank of Wisconsin. Mitchell Park and the shopping precinct of Mitchell Street were named in his honor. Mitchell's paternal grandmother, Martha Reed Mitchell, was well known in charity, art and society circles.

Mitchell's sister Ruth fought with the Chetniks in Yugoslavia during World War II, and later wrote a book about her brother, My Brother Bill.

Mitchell was accepted into Columbian University (later renamed George Washington University) in Washington, D.C., but dropped out to join the United States Army during the Spanish-American War, though he eventually graduated from the school. While there he was a member of Phi Kappa Psi fraternity. Upon dropping out of Columbian at age 18, he enlisted in the United States Army as a private and was mustered into Company M of the 1st Wisconsin Infantry Regiment on May 14, 1898. Mitchell was immediately assigned and mobilized into Brigadier General Arthur MacArthur's command in the Philippines, where MacArthur was placed in charge of the Department of Northern Luzon in the spring of 1899. Mitchell participated in operations against Filipino insurgents in northern and central Luzon at the end of the Spanish-American War and during the Philippine–American War. He quickly gained a commission due to his father's influence and joined the U.S. Army Signal Corps.

Following the cessation of hostilities, Mitchell remained in the Army. From 1900 to 1904, Mitchell was posted in the District of Alaska as a lieutenant in the Signal Corps. On May 26, 1900, the United States Congress appropriated $450,000 to establish a communications system connecting the many isolated and widely separated U.S. Army outposts and civilian Gold Rush camps in Alaska by telegraph. Along with Captain George C. Brunnell, Lieutenant Mitchell oversaw the construction of what became known as the Washington-Alaska Military Cable and Telegraph System (WAMCATS). He predicted as early as 1906, while an instructor at the Army's Signal School in Fort Leavenworth, Kansas, that future conflicts would take place in the air, not on the ground.

In 1908, as a young Signal Corps officer, Mitchell observed Orville Wright's flying demonstration at Fort Myer, Virginia. Mitchell took flight lessons at the Curtiss Flying School at Newport News, Virginia.

In March 1912, after assignments in the Philippines that saw him tour battlefields of the Russo-Japanese War and conclude that war with Japan was inevitable one day, Mitchell was one of 21 officers selected to serve on the General Staff—at the time, its youngest member at age 32. He appeared in August 1913 at legislative hearings considering a bill to make Army aviation a branch separate from the Signal Corps and testified against the bill. As the only Signal Corps officer on the General Staff, he was chosen as temporary head of the Aviation Section, U.S. Signal Corps, a predecessor of the present day United States Air Force, in May 1916, when its head was reprimanded and relieved of duty for malfeasance in the section. Mitchell administered the section until the new head, Lieutenant Colonel George O. Squier, arrived from attaché duties in London, England, where World War I was in progress, then became his permanent assistant. In June, he took private flying lessons at the Curtiss Flying School because he was proscribed by law from aviator training by age and rank, at an expense to himself of $1,470 (equivalent to about $43,000 in 2025). In July 1916, he was promoted to major and appointed Chief of the Air Service of the First Army.

== World War I ==
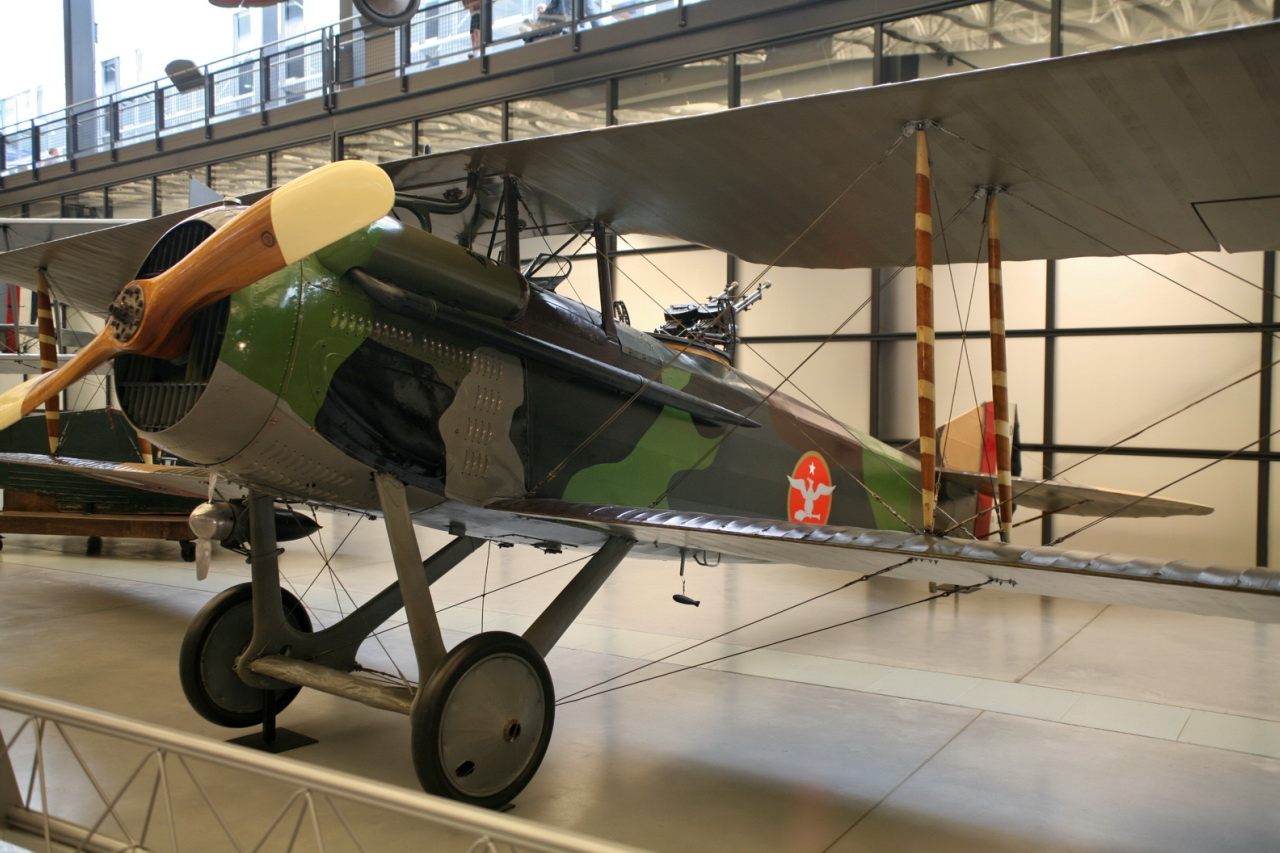
The French-built SPAD XVI which Mitchell piloted in the war, now exhibited inside the National Air and Space Museum in Washington, D.C. The SPAD XVI, an observation and bomber aircraft, has a Lewis twin machine gun mounted in the rear cockpit.

When the United States declared war on Germany on April 6, 1917, Mitchell was in Spain en route to France as an observer. He arrived in Paris on April 10, and set up an office for the Aviation Section from which he collaborated extensively with British and French air leaders such as General Hugh Trenchard, studying their strategies as well as their aircraft. On April 24, he made the first flight by an American officer over German lines, flying with a French pilot. Before long, Mitchell had gained enough experience to begin preparations for American air operations. Mitchell rapidly earned a reputation as a daring, flamboyant, and tireless leader. In May, he was promoted to lieutenant colonel. He was promoted to the temporary rank of colonel on October 10, 1917, to rank from August 5.

In September 1918, he planned and led nearly 1,500 British, French, and Italian aircraft in the air phase of the Battle of Saint-Mihiel, one of the first coordinated air-ground offensives in history. He was elevated to the rank of (temporary) brigadier general on October 14, 1918, and commanded all American air combat units in France. He ended the war as Chief of Air Service and Chief Group of Armies.

Recognized as one of the top American combat airmen of the war alongside aces such as his good friend, Eddie Rickenbacker, he was one of the best-known Americans in Europe. He was awarded the Distinguished Service Cross, the Distinguished Service Medal, the World War I Victory Medal with eight campaign clasps, and several foreign decorations. Despite his leadership and his combat record, he alienated many of his superiors during and after his 18 months of service in France.

== Post-war advocate of air power ==
=== Return from Europe ===
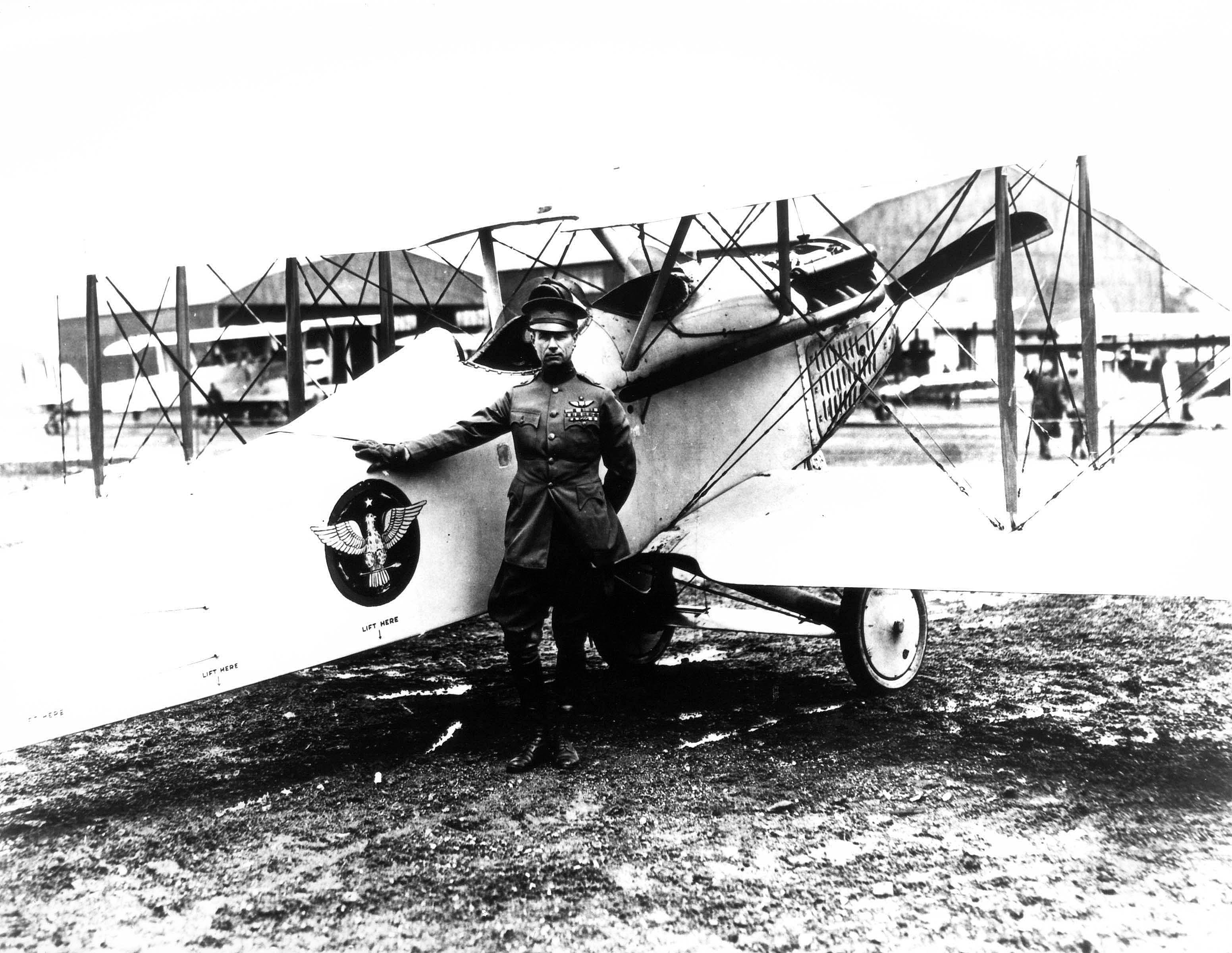
Mitchell posing with his Vought VE-7 Bluebird aircraft at the Bolling Field Air Tournament in Washington, D.C., held on May 14–16, 1920

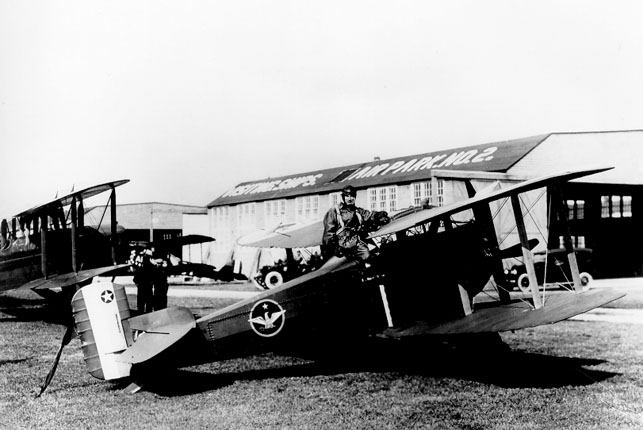
Mitchell posing with his Thomas-Morse MB-3

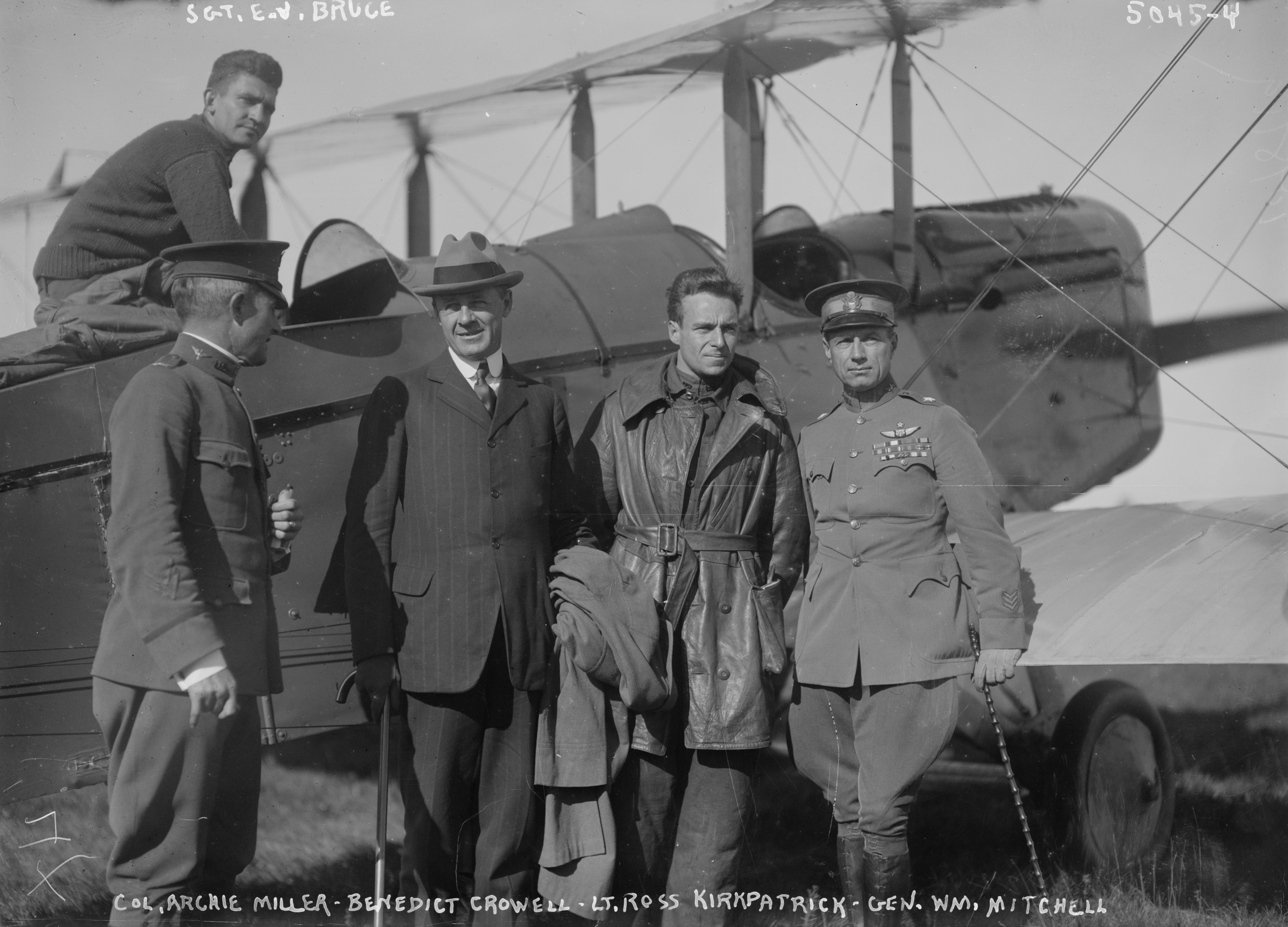
Col. Archie Miller, Benedict Crowell, Lt. Ross Kirkpatrick, Mitchell and Sgt. E.N. Bruce

Mitchell returned to the United States in January 1919; it had been widely expected throughout the Air Service that he would receive the post-war assignment of Director of Air Service. Instead, he returned to find that Maj. Gen. Charles T. Menoher, an artilleryman who had commanded the Rainbow Division in France, had been appointed director on the recommendation of his classmate General John Pershing, to maintain operational control of aviation by the ground forces.

Mitchell received appointment on February 28, 1919, as Director of Military Aeronautics, to head the flying component of the Air Service, but that office was in name only as it was a wartime agency that would expire six months after the signing of a peace treaty. Menoher instituted a reorganization of the Air Service based on the divisional system of the AEF, eliminating the DMA as an organization, and Mitchell was assigned as third assistant executive, in charge of the Training and Operations Group, Office of Director of Air Service (ODAS), in April 1919. He maintained his temporary wartime rank of brigadier general until June 18, 1920, when he was reduced to lieutenant colonel, Signal Corps (Menoher was reduced to brigadier general in the same orders).

When the Army was reorganized by Congress on June 4, 1920, the Air Service was recognized as a combatant arm of the line, third in size behind the Infantry and Artillery. On July 1, 1920, Mitchell was promoted to the Regular Army (i.e., permanent) rank of colonel in the Signal Corps, but also received a recess appointment (as did Menoher) on July 16 to become Assistant Chief of Air Service with the rank of brigadier general. On July 30, 1920, he was transferred and promoted to the permanent rank of colonel, Air Service, with date of rank from July 1, placing him first in seniority among all Air Service branch officers. On March 4, 1921, Mitchell was appointed Assistant Chief of Air Service by new president Warren G. Harding with consent of the Senate. On April 27, Mitchell was reappointed as a brigadier general with date of rank retroactive to July 2, 1920.

Mitchell did not share in the common belief that World War I would be the war to end war. "If a nation ambitious for universal conquest gets off to a flying start in a war of the future", he said, "it may be able to control the whole world more easily than a nation has controlled a continent in the past."

He returned from Europe with a fervent belief that within a near future, possibly within ten years, air power would become the predominant force of war, and that it should be united entirely in an independent air force equal to the Army and Navy. He found encouragement in a number of bills before Congress proposing a Department of Aeronautics that included an air force separate from either the Army or Navy, primarily legislation introduced concurrently in August 1919 by Senator Harry New of Indiana and Representative Charles F. Curry of California, influenced by the recommendations of a fact-finding commission sent to Europe under the direction of Assistant Secretary of War Benedict Crowell in early 1919 that contradicted the findings of Army boards and advocated an independent air force.

=== Friction with the Navy ===
Mitchell believed that the use of floating bases was necessary to defend the nation against naval threats, but the chief of naval operations, Admiral William S. Benson, had dissolved Naval Aeronautics as an organization early in 1919, a decision later reversed by Assistant Secretary of the Navy, Franklin D. Roosevelt. However, senior naval aviators feared that land-based aviators in a "unified" independent air force would no more understand the requirements of sea-based aviation than ground forces commanders understood the capabilities and potential of air power, and vigorously resisted any alliance with Mitchell.

The Navy's civilian leadership was equally opposed, if for other reasons. On April 3, Mitchell met with Roosevelt and a board of admirals to discuss aviation, and Mitchell urged the development of naval aviation because of the growing obsolescence of the surface fleet. His assurances that the Air Service could develop whatever bomb was needed to sink a battleship, and that a national defense organization of land, sea, and air components was essential and inevitable, were met with cool hostility. Mitchell found his ideas publicly denounced as "pernicious" by Roosevelt. Convinced that within as soon as ten years strategic air bombardment would become a threat to the United States and make the Air Service the nation's first line of defense instead of the Navy, he began to set out to prove that aircraft were capable of sinking ships to reinforce his position.

His relations with superiors continued to sour as he began to criticize both the War and Navy departments for being insufficiently farsighted regarding air power. He advocated the development of a number of aircraft innovations, including bomb-sights, sled-runner landing gear for winter operations, engine superchargers, and aerial torpedoes. He ordered the use of aircraft in fighting forest fires and border patrols. He also encouraged the staging of a transcontinental air race, a flight around the perimeter of the United States. He also encouraged Army pilots to break aviation records for speed, endurance and altitude. In short, he encouraged anything that would further develop the use of aircraft, and that would keep aviation in the news.

== Project B: Anti-ship bombing demonstration ==
In February 1921, at the urging of Mitchell, who was eager to test his theories of destruction of ships by aerial bombing, Secretary of War Newton Baker and Secretary of the Navy Josephus Daniels agreed to a series of joint Army-Navy exercises, known as Project B, to be held that summer in which surplus or captured ships could be used as targets.

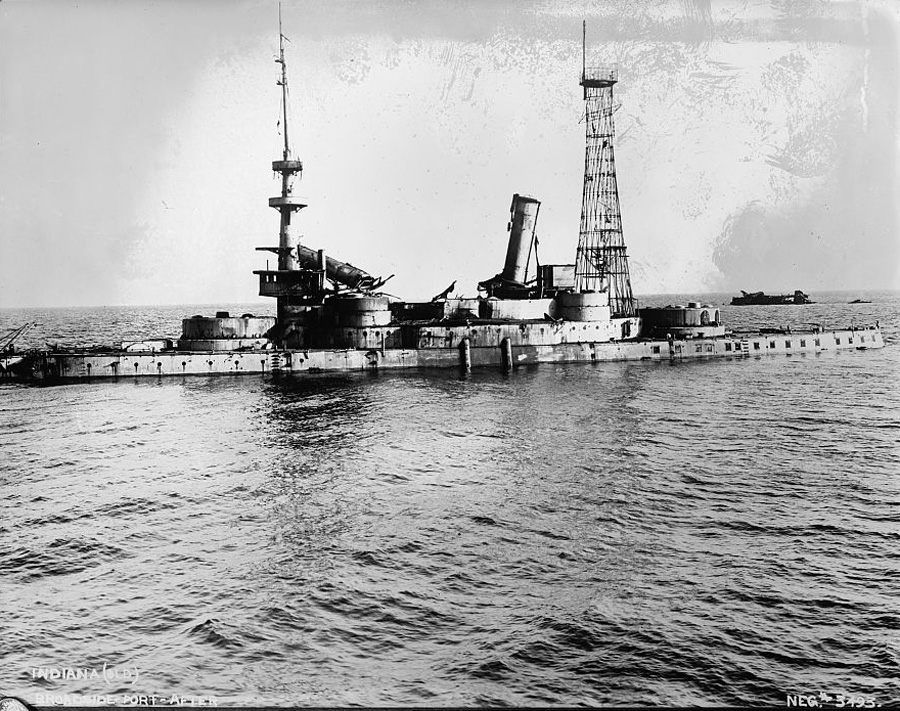
The wreck of the Indiana in the shallow waters of Chesapeake Bay. In the background the remains of San Marcos are visible.

Mitchell was concerned that the building of dreadnoughts was taking precious defense dollars away from military aviation. He was convinced that a force of anti-shipping airplanes could defend a coastline with more economy than a combination of coastal guns and naval vessels. A thousand bombers could be built at the same cost as one battleship, and could sink that battleship. Mitchell infuriated the Navy by claiming he could sink ships "under war conditions", and boasted he could prove it if he were permitted to bomb captured German battleships.

The Navy reluctantly agreed to the demonstration after news leaked of its own tests. To counter Mitchell, the Navy had sunk the old battleship Indiana near Tangier Island, Virginia, on November 1, 1920, using its own airplanes. Daniels had hoped to squelch Mitchell by releasing a report on the results written by Captain William D. Leahy stating that, "The entire experiment pointed to the improbability of a modern battleship being either destroyed or completely put out of action by aerial bombs." When the New-York Tribune revealed that the Navy's "tests" were done with dummy sand bombs and that the ship was actually sunk using high explosives placed on the ship, Congress introduced two resolutions urging new tests and backed the Navy into a corner.

In the arrangements for the new tests, there was to be a news blackout until all data had been analyzed at which point only the official news report would be released; Mitchell felt that the Navy was going to bury the results. The chief of the Air Corps attempted to have Mitchell dismissed a week before the tests began, reacting to Navy complaints about Mitchell's criticisms, but the new Secretary of War John W. Weeks backed down when it became apparent that Mitchell had widespread public and media support.

=== 1st Provisional Air Brigade ===
On May 1, 1921, Mitchell assembled the 1st Provisional Air Brigade, an air and ground crew of 125 aircraft and 1,000 men at Langley Field in Hampton, Virginia, using six squadrons from the Air Service:

- Air Service Field Officers School, Langley Field, Virginia, (SE-5 fighters)
  - 50th Squadron (Observation)
  - 88th Squadron
- 2nd Bombardment Group (later 2nd Bomb Group), Kelly Field, Texas (SE-5 fighters, Martin NBS-1, Handley-Page O/400, and Caproni CA-5 bombers)
  - 49th Squadron (Bombardment)
  - 96th Squadron (Bombardment)
- 7th Observation Group (Second Corps Area), (now the 7th Operations Group), Mitchel Field, New York (DH-4 and Douglas O-2 observation planes)
  - 1st Squadron (Observation)
  - 5th Squadron (Observation)

Mitchell took command on May 27 after testing bombs, fuses, and other equipment at Aberdeen Proving Ground and began training in anti-ship bombing techniques. Alexander Seversky, a veteran Russian pilot who had bombed German ships in the Great War, joined the effort, suggesting the bombers aim near the ships so that expanding water pressure from the underwater blasts would stave in and separate hull plates. Further discussion with Captain Alfred Wilkinson Johnson, Commander, Naval Air Force U.S. Atlantic Fleet aboard USS Shawmut, confirmed that near-miss bombs would inflict more damage than direct hits; near-misses would cause an underwater concussive effect against the hull.

=== Rules of engagement ===
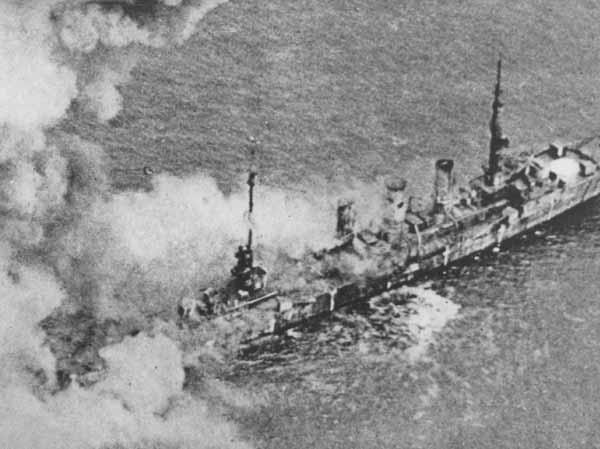
Frankfurt burning during bombing tests

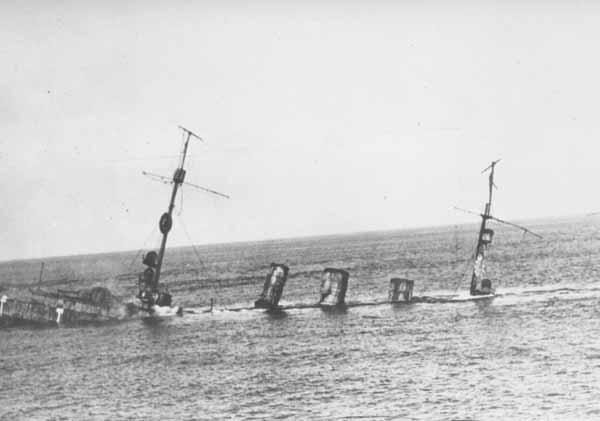
Frankfurt sunk

The Navy and the Air Service were at cross purposes regarding the tests. Supported by General Pershing, the Navy set rules and conditions that enhanced the survivability of the targets, stating that the purpose of the tests was to determine how much damage ships could withstand. The ships had to be sunk in at least 100 fathoms of water (so as not to become navigational hazards), and the Navy chose an area 50 mi (80 km) off the mouth of the Chesapeake Bay rather than either of two possible closer areas, minimizing the effective time the Army's bombers would have in the target area. The planes were forbidden from using aerial torpedoes, would be permitted only two hits on the battleship using their heaviest bombs, and would have to stop between hits so that a damage assessment party could go aboard. Smaller ships could not be struck by bombs larger than 600 pounds, and also were subject to the same interruptions in attacks.

Mitchell held to the Navy's restrictions for the tests of June 21, July 13, and July 18, and successfully sank the ex-German destroyer G-102 and the ex-German light cruiser Frankfurt in concert with Navy aircraft. On each of these demonstrations the ships were first attacked by SE-5 fighters strafing and bombing the decks of the ships with 25-pound anti-personnel bombs to simulate suppression of antiaircraft fire, followed by attacks from Martin NBS-1 (Martin MB-2) twin-engine bombers using high explosive demolition bombs. Mitchell observed the attacks from the controls of his DH-4 aircraft, nicknamed The Osprey.

=== Sinking of the Ostfriesland ===
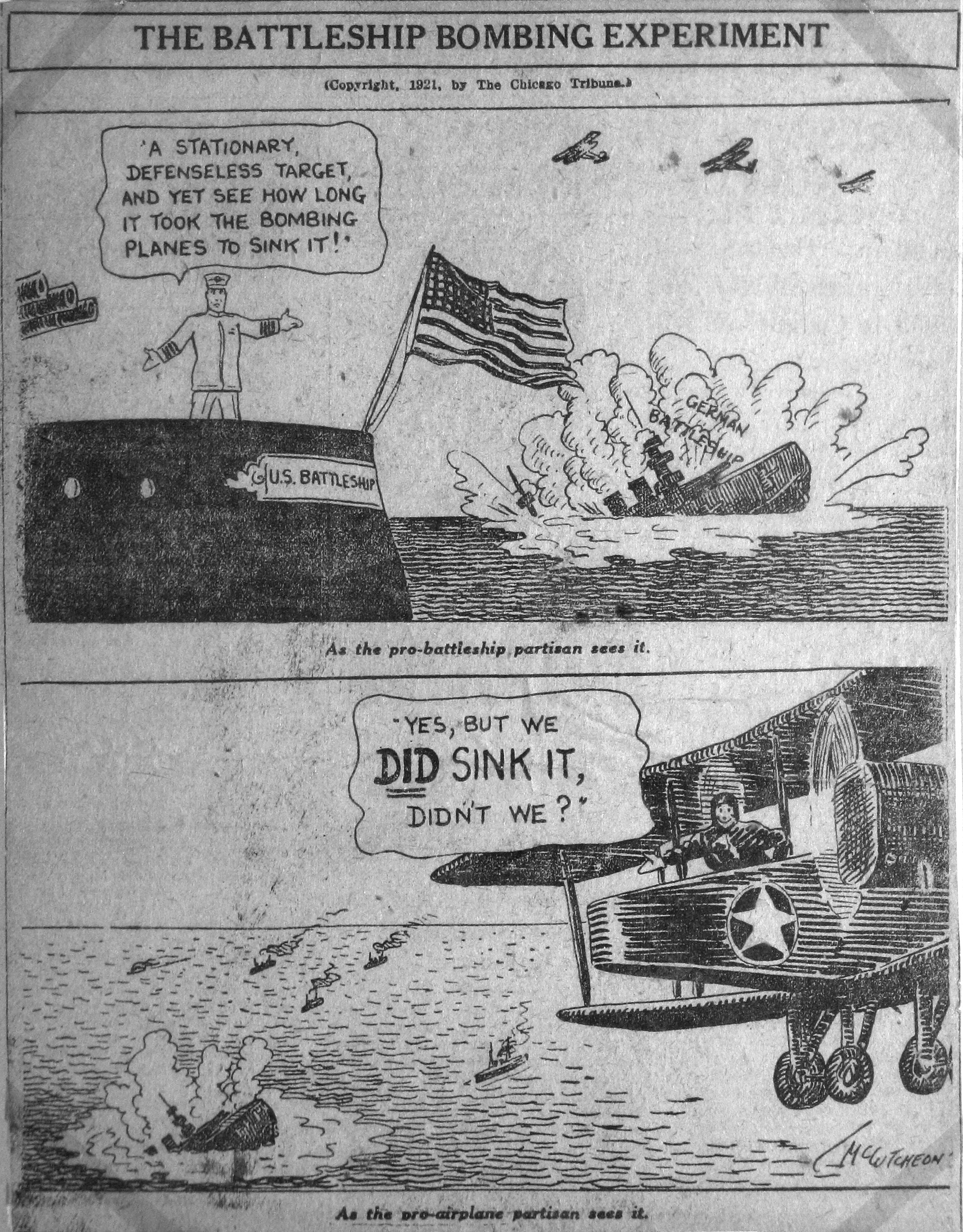
1921 cartoon in the Chicago Tribune

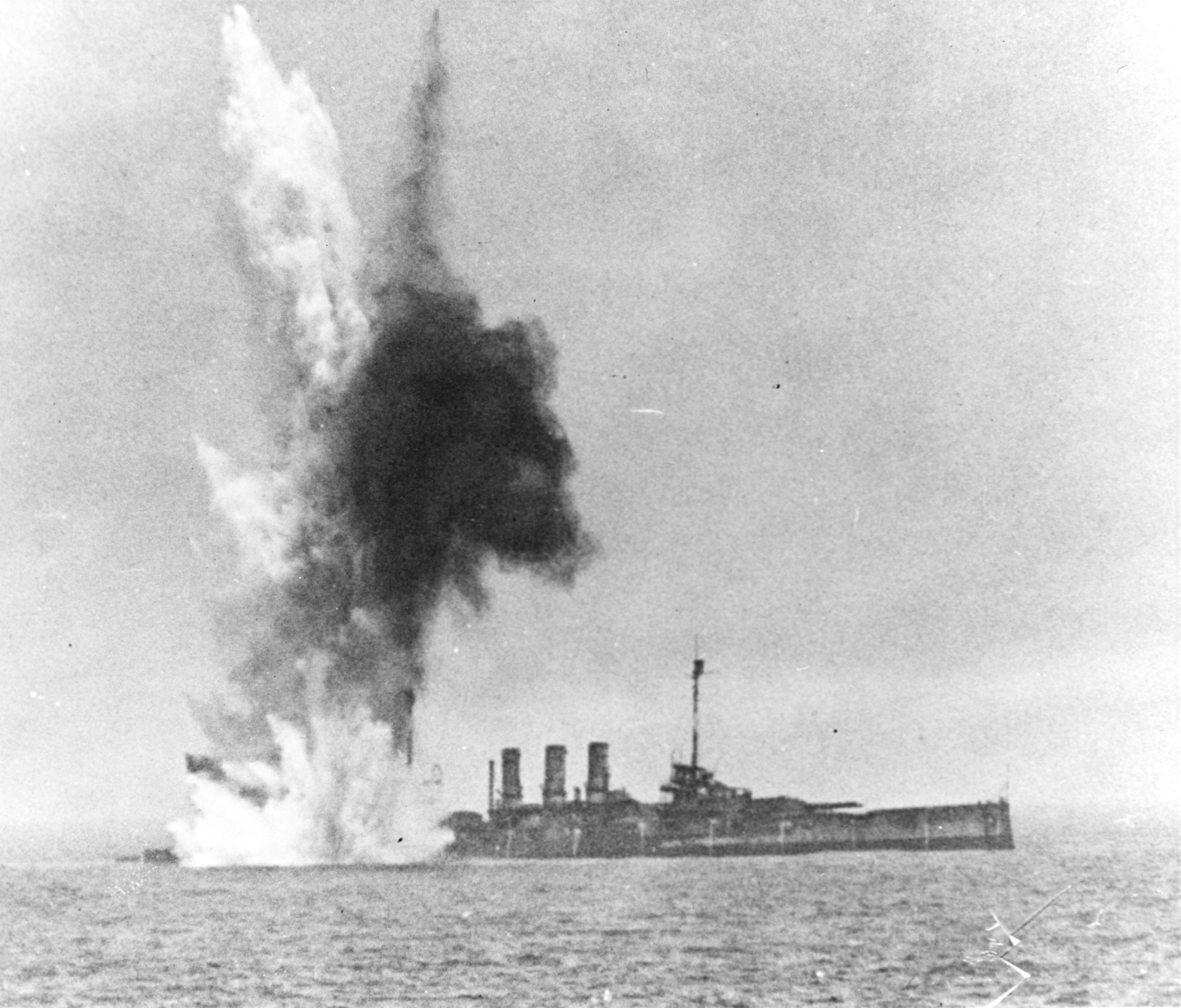
A 2,000 lb bomb "near-miss" severely damages Ostfriesland at the stern hull plates.

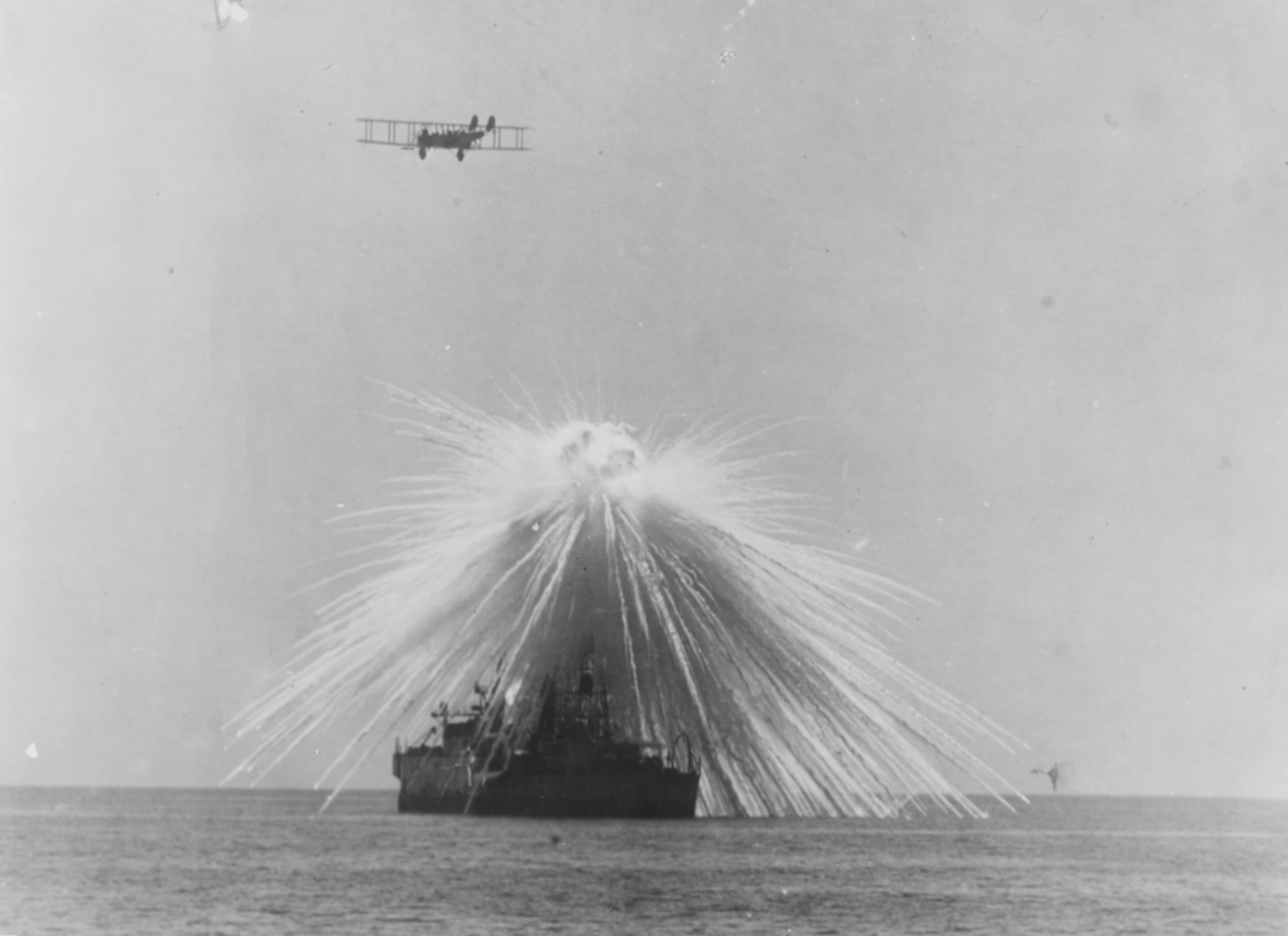
USS Alabama hit by a white phosphorus bomb dropped by an NBS-1 in bombing tests, September 1921

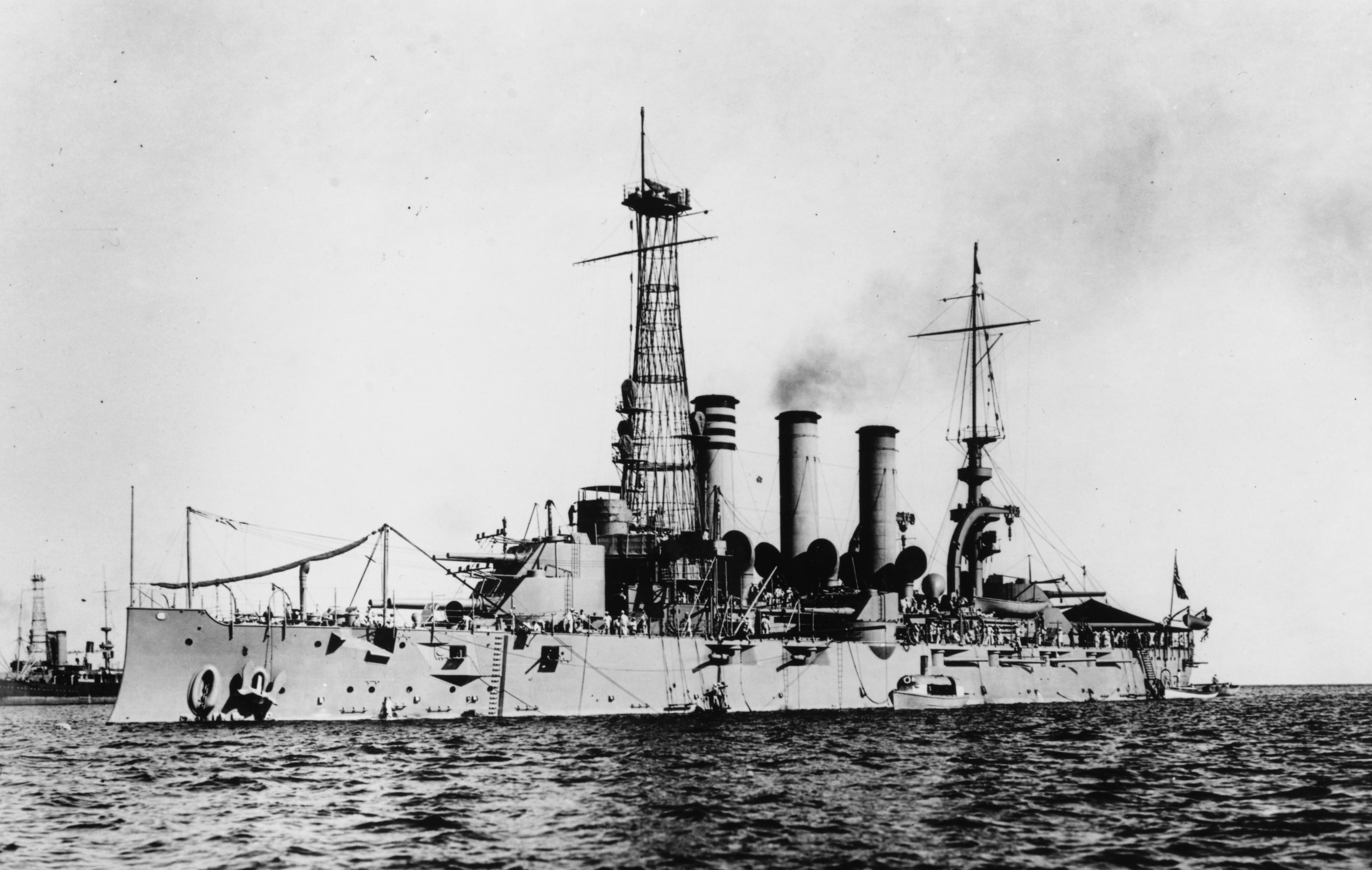
USS Virginia

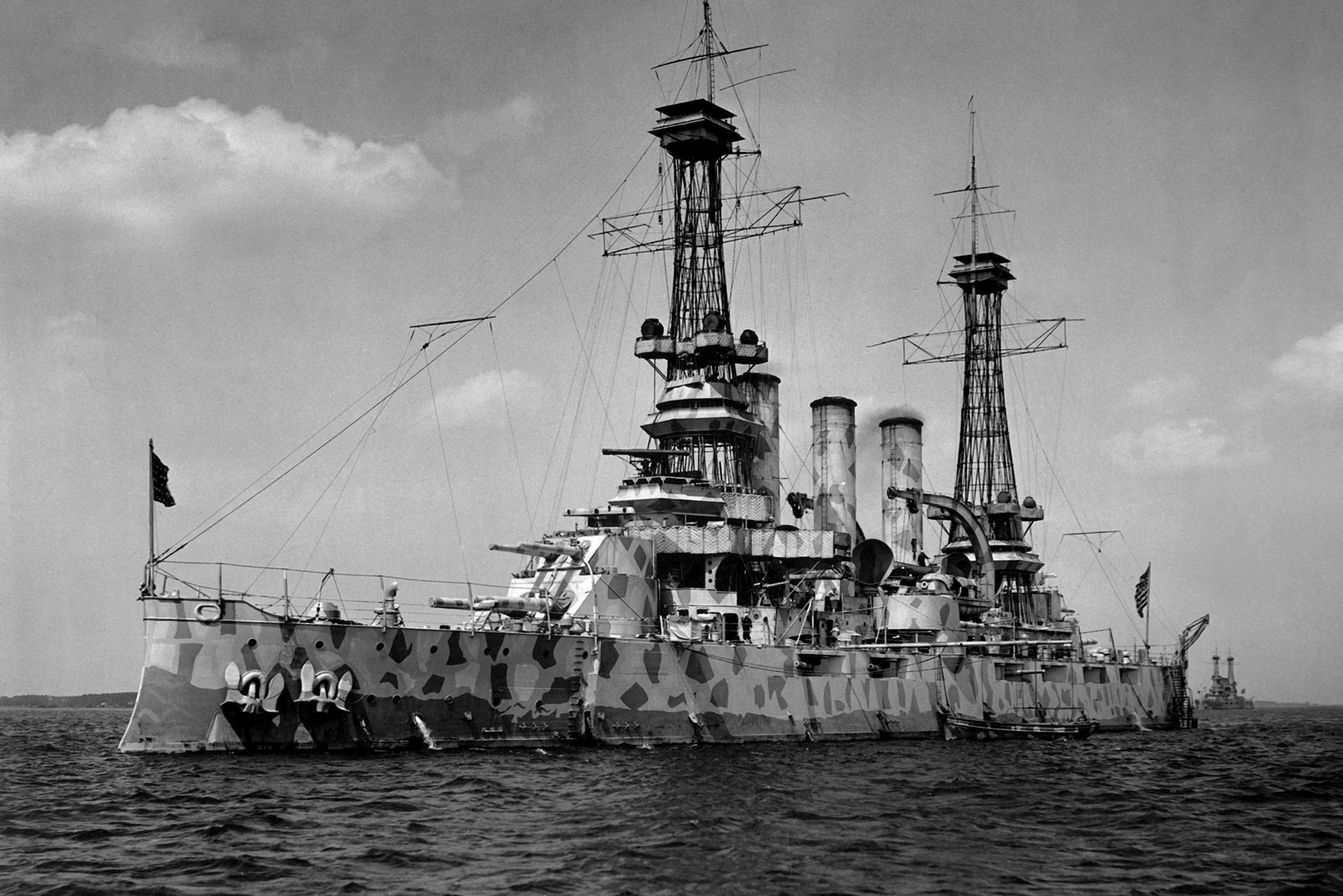
USS New Jersey 1918

On July 20, 1921, the Navy brought out the ex-German World War I battleship, Ostfriesland. On the scheduled day, 230, 550, and 600 lb (100, 250, and 270 kg) bomb attacks by Navy, Marine Corps, and Army aircraft settled the Ostfriesland three feet by the stern with a five-degree list to port. She was taking on water. Further bombing was delayed a day, the Navy claiming due to rough seas that prevented their Board of Observers from going aboard, the Air Service countering that as the Army bombers approached, they were ordered not to attack. Mitchell's bombers were forced to circle for 47 minutes, as a result of which they dropped only half their bombs, and none of their large bombs.

On the morning of July 21, in accordance with a strictly orchestrated schedule of attacks, five Martin NBS-1 bombers led by 1st Lt. Clayton Bissell dropped a single 1,100 lb (500 kg) bomb each, scoring three direct hits. The Navy stopped further drops, although the Army bombers had nine bombs remaining, to assess damage. By noon, Ostfriesland had settled two more feet by the stern and one foot by the bow.

At this point, Capt. Walter R. Lawson's flight of bombers, consisting of two Handley-Page O/400 and six Martin NBS-1 bombers loaded with 2,000 lb (910 kg) bombs, was dispatched. One Handley Page dropped out for mechanical reasons, but the NBS-1s dropped six bombs in quick succession between 12:18 pm and 12:31 pm. Bomb aiming points were for the water near the ship. Mitchell described Lawson's attack, "Four bombs hit in rapid succession, close alongside the Ostfriesland. We could see her rise eight to ten feet between the terrific blows from under water. On the fourth shot, Capt Streett, sitting in the back seat of my plane stood up and waving both arms shouted, "She is gone!" There were no direct hits but at least three of the bombs landed close enough to rip hull plates as well as cause the ship to roll over. The ship sank at 12:40 pm, 22 minutes after the first bomb, with a seventh bomb dropped by the Handley Page on the foam rising up from the sinking ship. Nearby the site, observing, were various foreign and domestic officials aboard the USS Henderson.

Although Mitchell had stressed "war-time conditions", the tests were under static conditions and the sinking of the Ostfriesland was accomplished by violating rules agreed upon by General Pershing that would have allowed Navy engineers to examine the effects of smaller munitions. Navy studies of the wreck of the Ostfriesland show she had suffered little topside damage from bombs and was sunk by progressive flooding that might have been stemmed by a fast-acting damage control party on board the vessel. Mitchell used the sinking for his own publicity purposes, though his results were downplayed in public by General of the Armies John J. Pershing who hoped to smooth Army/Navy relations. The efficacy of the tests remains in debate to this day.

Nevertheless, the test was highly influential at the time, causing budgets to be redrawn for further air development and forcing the Navy to look more closely at the possibilities of naval air power. Despite the advantages enjoyed by the bombers in the artificial exercise, Mitchell's report stressed points which would later be highly influential in war:

sea craft of all kinds, up to and including the most modern battleships, can be destroyed easily by bombs dropped from aircraft, and further, that the most effective means of destruction are bombs. [They] demonstrated beyond a doubt that, given sufficient bombing planes—in short an adequate air force—aircraft constitute a positive defense of our country against hostile invasion.

The fact of battleship sinking was indisputable, and Mitchell repeated the performance twice in tests conducted with like results on the U.S. pre-dreadnought battleships Alabama in September 1921, and the Virginia and New Jersey in September 1923. The latter two ships were subjected to teargas attacks and hit with specially designed 4,300 lb (2,000 kg) demolition bombs.

=== Aftermath of the bombing tests ===
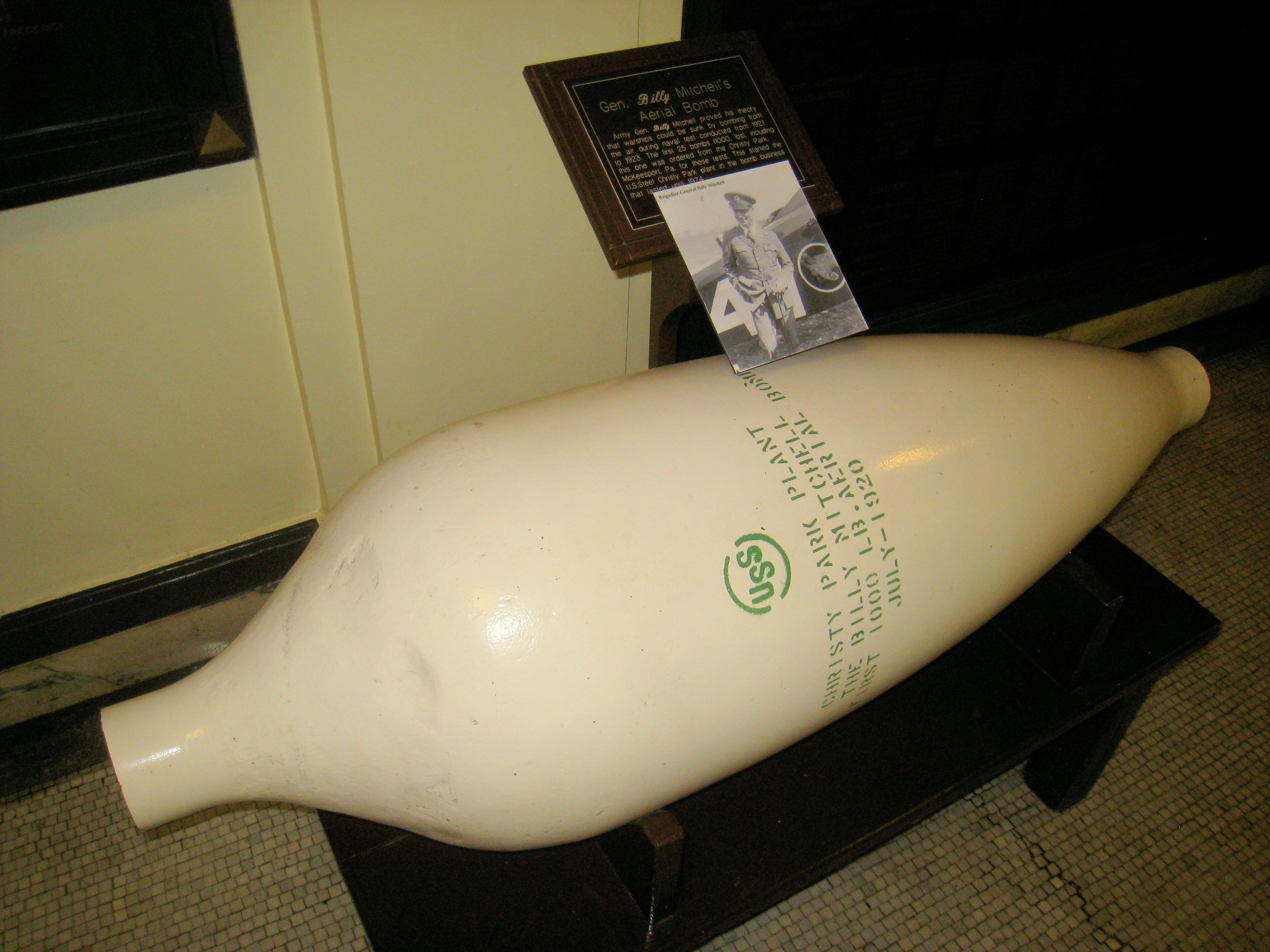
Stenciled sign, "USS" (United States Steel Corporation) and "Christy Park Plant The Billy Mitchell first 1000 lb aerial bomb July 1920" on display at Soldiers and Sailors National Military Museum and Memorial, Pittsburgh, on August 24, 2010

The bombing tests had several immediate and turbulent results. Almost immediately the Navy and President Harding were incensed by an apparent demonstration of naval weakness just after Harding had announced, on July 10, invitations to other naval powers to gather in Washington for a conference on the limitation of naval armaments. Statements asserting the obsolescence of the battleship by disarmament proponents in Congress such as Senator William Borah heightened official anxiety. Both services tried to defuse the results by reports from the Joint Board and General Pershing dismissing Mitchell's claims and suppressing his report, but the report was leaked to the press.

In September, General Charles T. Menoher forced a showdown over Mitchell as the bombing tests continued. Menoher confronted Secretary Weeks and demanded that Weeks either relieve Mitchell as Assistant Chief of Air Corps or he would resign. On October 4, Weeks allowed Menoher to resign and return to the ground forces "for personal reasons". A reciprocal resignation offer from Mitchell was refused.

Major General Mason Patrick was again chosen by Pershing to sort out a mess in the Air Service and became the new chief on October 5. Patrick made it clear to Mitchell that although he would accept Mitchell's expertise as counsel, all decisions would be made by Patrick. When Mitchell soon got into a minor but embarrassing protocol rift with Rear Admiral William A. Moffett at the start of the naval arms limitation conference, Patrick assigned him to an inspection tour of Europe with Alfred V. Verville and Lieutenant Clayton Bissell that lasted the duration of the conference over the winter of 1921–22.

== West Virginia ==
Mitchell was dispatched by President Harding to West Virginia to stop the warfare that had broken out between the United Mine Workers, Stone Mountain Coal Company, the Baldwin–Felts Detective Agency, and other groups after the Matewan Massacre. Miners outraged by the ambush slaying of Matewan Police Chief Sid Hatfield by agents for the coal company marched on Mingo and Logan County leading to the Battle of Blair Mountain, August 25 to September 2, 1921. On August 26, Mitchell commanded Army bombers from Maryland to Charleston, West Virginia. Mitchell told the press that Army bombers alone could end the "Mingo War" by dropping tear gas on the miners. A private army of 3,000 led by Sheriff Don Chafin and financed by the Coal Operators Association engaged in gun battles and used private planes to drop dynamite charges and World War I surplus gas and explosive bombs against an estimated 13,000 miners. Neither side responded to President Harding's August 30 proclamation to cease hostilities. In the last days of the civil disturbance, Mitchell's bombers flew several reconnaissance missions but did not engage in combat; one bomber crashed on a return flight, killing three crew members. On September 3, surrounded by 2,000 Army troops, Chafin's force dispersed and most miners went home although some surrendered to the Army. Later, Mitchell cited the "Mingo War" as an example of the potential for air power in civil disturbances.

== Promoting air power ==
The day has passed when armies on the ground or navies on the sea can be the arbiter of a nation's destiny in war. The main power of defense and the power of initiative against an enemy has passed to the air. – November 1918

In 1922, while in Europe for General Patrick, Mitchell met the Italian air power theorist Giulio Douhet and soon afterwards an excerpted translation of Douhet's The Command of the Air began to circulate in the Air Service. In 1924, Gen. Patrick again dispatched him on an inspection tour, this time to Hawaii and Asia, to get him off the front pages. Mitchell came back with a 324-page report that predicted future war with Japan, including the attack on Pearl Harbor. Of note, Mitchell discounted the value of aircraft carriers in an attack on the Hawaiian Islands, believing they were of little practical use because they could not operate effectively on the high seas or deliver "sufficient aircraft in the air at one time to insure a concentrated operation". Instead, Mitchell believed a surprise attack on the Hawaiian Islands would be conducted by land-based aircraft operating from islands in the Pacific. His report, published in 1925 as the book Winged Defense, foretold wider benefits of an investment in air power, believing it to be, at both that time and in the future, "a dominating factor in the world's development", both for national defense and economic benefit. Winged Defense sold only 4,500 copies between August 1925 and January 1926, the months surrounding the publicity of the court martial, and so Mitchell did not reach a wide audience.

=== Friction and demotion ===
Mitchell experienced difficulties within the Army, notably with his superiors when he appeared before the Lampert Committee of the U.S. House of Representatives and sharply castigated Army and Navy leadership. The War Department had endorsed a proposal to establish a "General Headquarters Air Force" as a vehicle for modernization and expansion of the Air Service, to be funded through shared appropriations for aviation with the Navy, but shelved the plan when the Navy refused, incensing Mitchell.

In March 1925, when Mitchell's term as assistant chief of the Air Service expired, he reverted to his permanent rank of colonel and was transferred to San Antonio, Texas, as air officer to the Eighth Corps Area. Although such demotions were not unusual in demobilizations (Patrick himself had gone from major general to colonel upon returning to the Army Corps of Engineers in 1919), the move was widely seen as punishment and exile, since Mitchell had petitioned to remain as assistant chief when his term expired, and his transfer to an assignment with no political influence at a relatively unimportant Army base had been directed by Secretary of War John Weeks.

== Court-martial ==
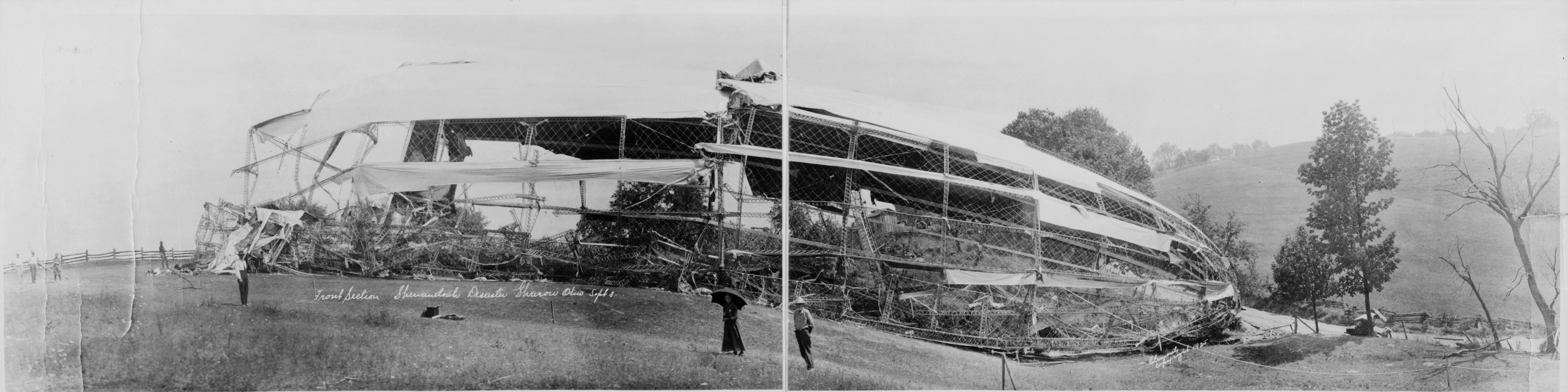
The front section of the Shenandoah wreck

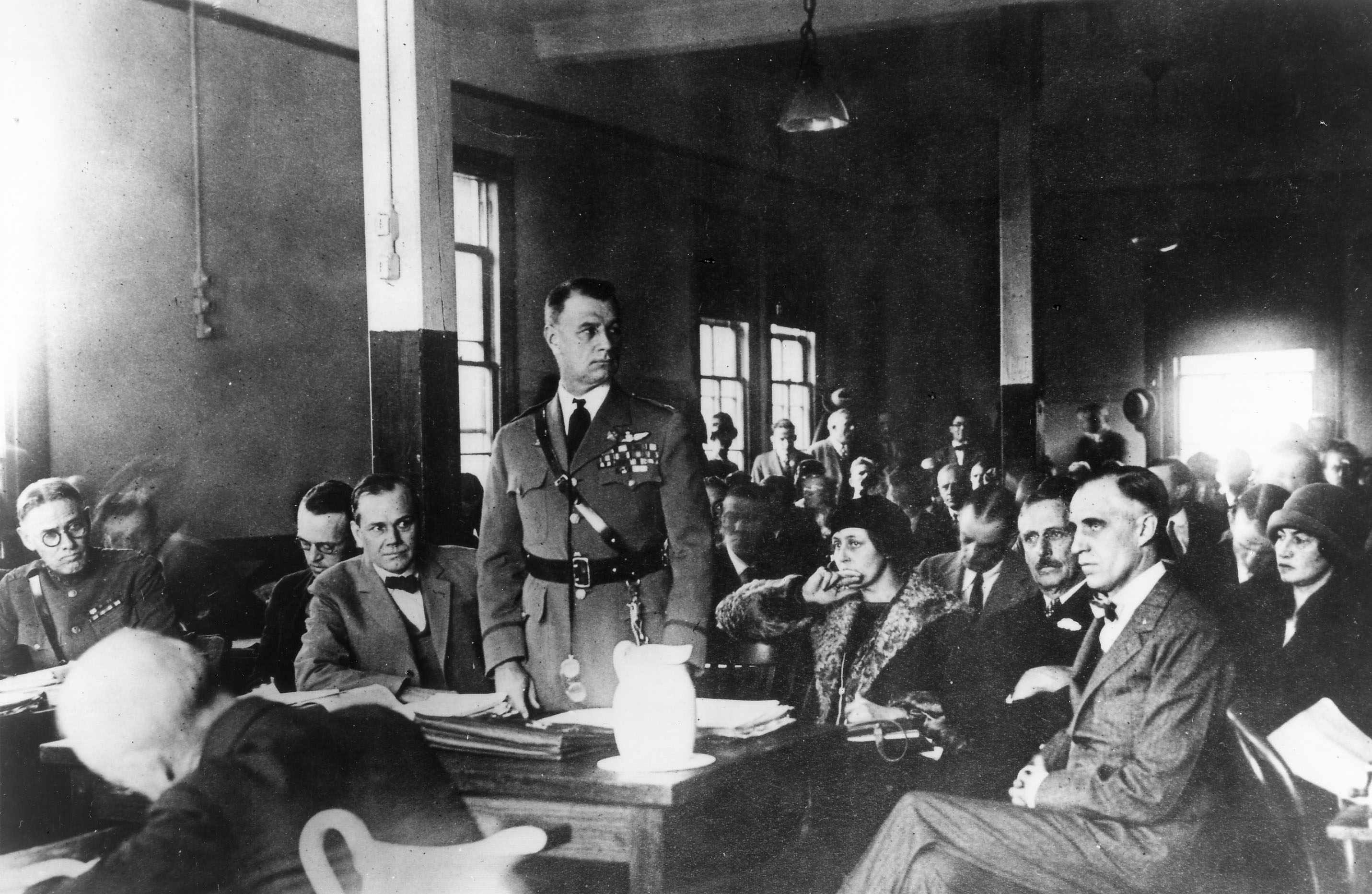
A scene taken from Mitchell's court-martial, 1925. This scene was recreated for the 1955 movie The Court-Martial of Billy Mitchell. Mitchell is wearing the "turned-down" collar uniform, for which the Air Service had campaigned for several years. The prosecutor, Allen W. Gullion, is wearing a high "standard military" collar.

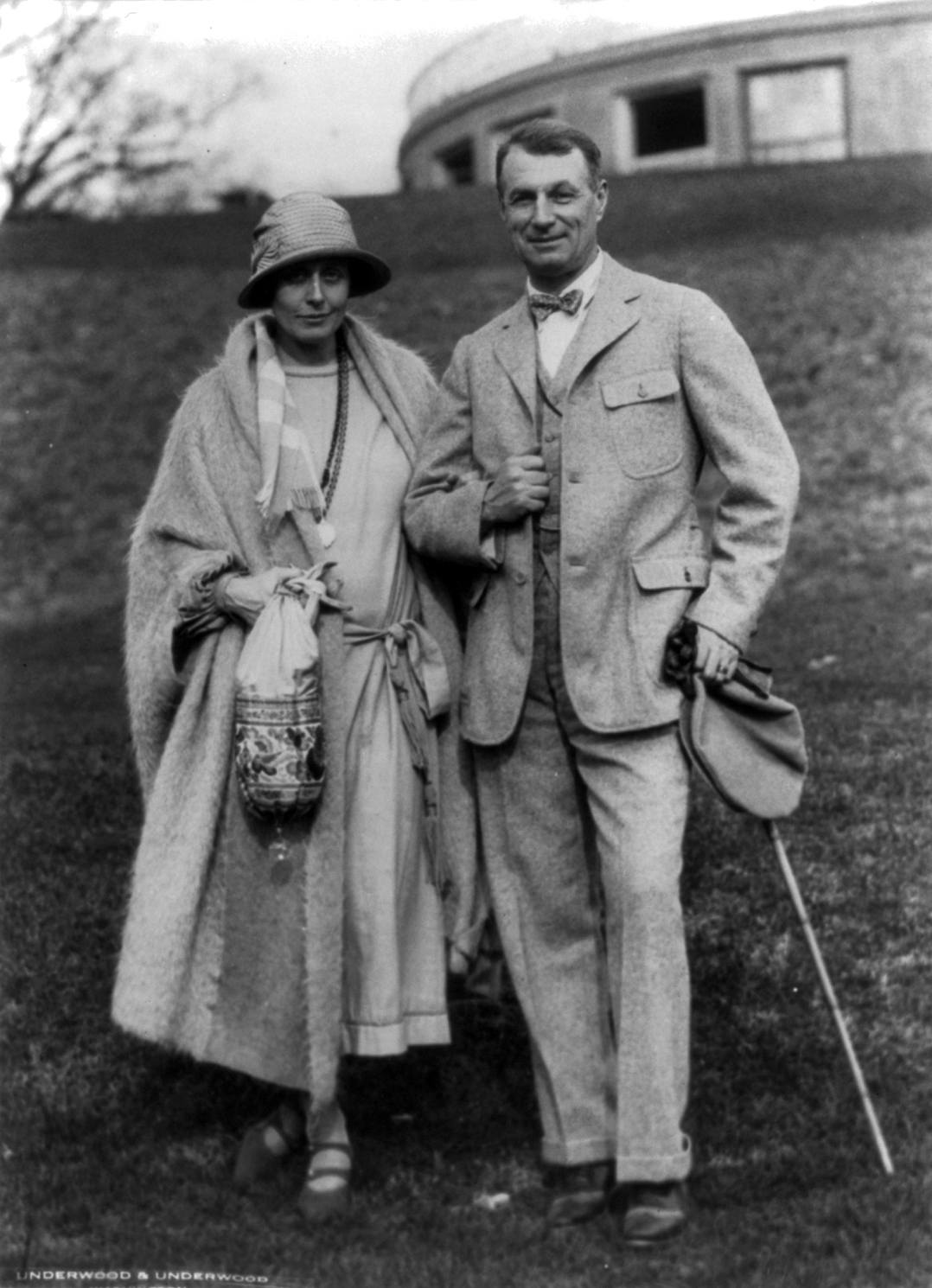
Mitchell with his wife Elizabeth, 1925

On September 5, 1925, Mitchell issued the statement that would lead to his court-martial from his office in San Antonio. This came two days after the Navy's first helium-filled rigid airship, Shenandoah, crashed in a storm, killing 14 of the crew, and the loss of three seaplanes on a flight from the West Coast to Hawaii. Mitchell accused senior leaders in the Army and Navy of incompetence and "almost treasonable administration of the national defense." In October 1925, a charge with eight specifications was proffered against Mitchell on the direct order of President Calvin Coolidge, accusing him of violation of the 96th Article of War, an omnibus article that Mitchell's chief counsel, Congressman Frank Reid, declared to be unconstitutional as a violation of free speech. The court-martial began in early November and lasted for seven weeks.

The youngest of the 13 judges was Major General Douglas MacArthur, who later described the order to sit on Mitchell's court-martial as "one of the most distasteful orders I ever received." Of the thirteen judges, (Charles Pelot Summerall, William S. Graves, Robert L. Howze, MacArthur, Benjamin A. Poore, Fred W. Sladen, Ewing E. Booth, Albert J. Bowley, George Irwin, Edward K. King, Frank R. McCoy, Edwin B. Winans, and Blanton Winship), none had aviation experience and three (Summerall, who was the president of the court, Sladen, and Bowley) were removed by defense challenges for bias. The case was then presided over by Major General Robert Lee Howze. Among those who testified for Mitchell were Eddie Rickenbacker, Hap Arnold, Carl Spaatz, Ira Eaker, Robert Olds, Thomas George Lanphier Sr. and Fiorello La Guardia. The trial attracted significant interest, and public opinion supported Mitchell. The chief prosecutors were Major Allen W. Gullion, Lieutenant Joseph L. McMullen, and Colonel Sherman Moreland.

Mitchell's public assertions about non-aviation officers being ignorant of aviation matters were shown to be based on events he falsely claimed to have witnessed in Hawaii during experiments led by Lesley J. McNair, the Hawaiian Department's assistant chief of staff for operations (G-3). During the Army's ongoing debate over the best methods for providing coastal defense, which engaged proponents of the Coast Artillery branch and Army Air Service, McNair's panel compared the use of coast artillery and aircraft for shore defense. The panel concluded that coastal artillery was sufficient, provided that adequate listening and lighting equipment for detecting and illuminating enemy ships and planes was available, and that bombers were less accurate, but more effective at destroying enemy ships at longer distances from shore, provided they could overcome obstacles including inclement weather. Summerall, the department commander, was so incensed at Mitchell's questioning of his and McNair's integrity that he attempted to be appointed as president of the court-martial. During Mitchell's trial, Major General Robert Courtney Davis, the Army's adjutant general, ordered Summerall and McNair to provide testimony. They refuted Mitchell's claims that during his time in Hawaii in 1923 the Hawaiian Department had no plan to defend Oahu from Japanese attack. They also demonstrated that Mitchell was incorrect in stating that the Air Service was not treated fairly in the distribution of resources in Hawaii; in fact, Summerall had reallocated funding, equipment and other items from other branches to the Air Service.

The court found the truth or falsity of Mitchell's accusations to be immaterial to the charge and on December 17, 1925, found him "guilty of all specifications and of the charge". The court suspended him from active duty for five years without pay, which President Coolidge later reduced to half-pay. The generals' ruling in the case wrote, "The Court is thus lenient because of the military record of the Accused during the World War." MacArthur (who himself in 1951 was removed from duty for similar reasons) later said he had voted to acquit, and Fiorello La Guardia said that MacArthur's "not guilty" ballot had been found in the judges' anteroom. MacArthur felt "that a senior officer should not be silenced for being at variance with his superiors in rank and with accepted doctrine."

In 1958, Mitchell's son from his second marriage, William Mitchell, petitioned the Air Force Board for Correction of Military Records to reverse his father's conviction. The board recommended vacating the conviction, but USAF Secretary James H. Douglas Jr. refused on the grounds that while Mitchell's airpower views "have been vindicated," this did not "affect the propriety or impropriety" of Mitchell's insubordinate behavior. According to Douglas, by remaining on active duty, Mitchell "was bound to accept the consequences imposed by his service responsibilities."

== Later life ==
Mitchell resigned instead on February 1, 1926, and spent the next decade writing and preaching air power to all who would listen. However, his departure from the service sharply reduced his ability to influence military policy and public opinion. Mitchell viewed the election of his one-time antagonist Franklin D. Roosevelt as advantageous for air power, and met with him early in 1932 to brief him on his concepts for a unification of the military in a Department of Defense. His ideas intrigued and interested Roosevelt. Mitchell believed he might receive an appointment as Assistant Secretary of War for Air or perhaps even Secretary of War in a Roosevelt administration, but neither prospect materialized.

== Personal life ==
Mitchell married his first wife, Caroline Stoddard, on December 2, 1903. They had three children: Harriet, Elizabeth, and John Lendrum III. Although the marriage was initially happy, his behavior became more and more erratic primarily as a result of his heavy drinking. The two had a bitter divorce, rife with accusations on both sides, which was finalized on September 22, 1922. On September 27, after a Milwaukee courtroom trial, the judge decided in Caroline's favor. Lawyers for Caroline and biographers reported that the marital problems were caused by Billy Mitchell, who became so erratic that his wife even considered sending him to a psychiatrist. Caroline won custody of the children and alimony including $400.00 a month in child support.

A year later, on October 11, 1923, Mitchell married his second wife, Elizabeth Trumbull Miller. They had two children, Lucy and William Jr. In 1926, Mitchell made his home with his wife Elizabeth at the 120-acre (0.5 km^{2}) Boxwood Farm in Middleburg, Virginia, which remained his primary residence until his death.

== Death ==
On February 19, 1936, Mitchell died in New York City at Doctors Hospital of a coronary occlusion. He had been admitted to the hospital on January 28. He was 56 years old.

Mitchell was buried at Forest Home Cemetery in Milwaukee, Wisconsin. None of Mitchell's children from his first marriage attended the funeral. His widow, Elizabeth, later married Thomas Bolling Byrd, the brother of Virginia governor Harry F. Byrd Sr. and explorer Richard E. Byrd.

Mitchell's son, John Lendrum Mitchell III, enlisted in the Army on October 10, 1941. Promoted to first lieutenant in the 4th Armored Division, and stationed at Pine Camp, New York (now Fort Drum), he died from a blood infection on October 27, 1942. He was buried at Arlington National Cemetery. Mitchell's first cousin, the Canadian George Croil, went on to secure an autonomous status for the Royal Canadian Air Force and in 1938 became its first chief of the Air Staff.

== Attempts at posthumous promotion ==
In 1940, a bill was introduced in Congress that sought to posthumously promote Mitchell to the rank of major general, but it did not pass. A similar bill was drafted in 1942 to promote Mitchell to brigadier general. According to the Office of Air Force History, "this effort failed to follow the normal process, which called for the War and Navy Departments to submit recommendations to the White House." Instead, only the Senate participated, and passed a joint resolution. Reportedly, "this approach did require the approval of the House, which was not forthcoming." As a result, Mitchell did not actually receive a posthumous promotion, although many misunderstood the Senate resolution as authorizing this. Bills were introduced in 1943 to promote Mitchell to brigadier general and also to major general, which did not pass. In 1945, the same legislation was introduced for a promotion to major general, but it also did not pass. Another bill was introduced in 1947 to the same effect which did not pass either.

In 2004, Mitchell's posthumous promotion was finally authorized in the FY2005 National Defense Authorization Act. According to the former editor of Air Force Magazine, "neither the Pentagon nor the White House took any action as a result of the authorization," which meant Mitchell was never promoted. That bill was introduced by Rep. Charles Bass (R-N.H.), himself a relative of Mitchell's, and whose own father, Rep. Perkins Bass (R-N.H.), had also previously sponsored legislation to posthumously promote Mitchell. Reportedly, the promotion authorization drew on "muted support" from the USAF, which may explain why the bill was not acted on. One author wrote that Mitchell's true history was more complicated than the simple narrative that he was a passionate airpower advocate; according to one historian, he was "vain, petulant, racist, overbearing, and egotistical", which may explain reservations about the many attempts to revise his legacy. An air force officer reflected that if Mitchell's promotion were granted, it would be "only a pyrrhic victory", since it would not "erase the questionable actions that proceeded from his passionate advocacy of airpower's independence".

Mitchell is often referred to as a "brigadier general (temporary)" because of his holding temporary rank during World War I and later after the war, although his permanent grade was colonel both during his temporary service as a general officer as well as at the time he resigned. Congress subsequently passed legislation in 1930 that permitted "all commissioned officers who served in the Army, Navy, Marine Corps, and/or Coast Guard of the United States during the World War, and who have been or may be hereafter retired according to law . . . shall . . . be advanced in rank on the retired list to the highest grade held by them during the World War". However, it appears that since this act required the officer to be formally retired, it did not apply to Mitchell because he had resigned his commission rather than be subject to the pay forfeiture from his court martial conviction. Indeed, none of the Army Registers from 1926 to 1932 list him as retired. However, the 1930 legislation did allow non-retirees to use the wartime titles of ranks they had held honorably, meaning that Mitchell could subsequently call himself a brigadier general without actually being one as a matter of law. This was a curious status that likely applied to very few general officers, since unlike Mitchell, the vast majority were careerists who subsequently were retired by law.

== Congressional Gold Medal ==
Be it enacted by the Senate and House of Representatives of the United States of America in Congress assembled, That the President of the United States is requested to cause a gold medal to be struck, with suitable emblems, devices and inscriptions, to be presented to the late William Mitchell, formerly a Colonel, United States Army, in recognition of his outstanding pioneer service and foresight in the field of American military aviation.

There has been some confusion regarding Mitchell's medal being a Medal of Honor instead of a Congressional Gold Medal, because it was erroneously listed as a Medal of Honor in the Committee on Veterans' Affairs report of 1979 which is often used as a modern index of Medal of Honor listings. According to the Army's Center of Military History, "it seems apparent that the intention was to award the Gold Medal rather than the Medal of Honor," but the Center included Mitchell's award because of the error on the Senate report. The Senate error was a consequence of a drafting mistake when the bill was in committee. The House Committee on Military Affairs confused the Medal of Honor with the Congressional Gold Medal in its first draft of the bill, and then retroactively amended the text to remove "a Medal of Honor" and replace it with "a gold medal," but neglected to correct the title of the bill. However, the Committee clarified that "the legislation under consideration does not authorize an award of the Congressional Medal of Honor," which clearly settled the matter. The medal in question is listed as a Congressional Gold Medal in the database of the House of Representatives. In spite of these verifiable facts, the U.S. Air Force still lists Mitchell as a Medal of Honor recipient (and also incorrectly claims that he was posthumously promoted to major general on July 18, 1947), even though he has been removed from the official list published online by the Department of Defense. According to one author, the Air Force's continued representation that Mitchell is a Medal of Honor recipient constitutes "misinformation" and is "inexplicable, since Congress lists the award as a Gold Medal, the Air Force formally participated in the Gold Medal's design, and the National Museum of the Air Force currently possesses the replica Gold Medal in question." The National Museum of the Air Force displays Mitchell's Gold Medal publicly, with the caption that "This is the Congressional Gold Medal awarded posthumously to Gen. Billy Mitchell in 1946. This medallion, the only one of its kind, was sculpted by Erwin F. Springweiler and struck by the Philadelphia Mint." Since the medal in question is on public display, it is easily verifiable as not being a Medal of Honor. Several Medal of Honor historians have also published on this subject due to repeated confusion over Mitchell's award.

== Military and civilian awards ==
Note – Incomplete list. The dates indicate the year the award was presented and not necessarily the date it was earned.

=== Mitchell's military awards ===
U.S. Army decorations
Distinguished Service Cross (1918)
Distinguished Service Medal (1919)
U.S. Army Service Medals
Spanish War Service Medal (1918)
Philippine Campaign Medal (1905)
Army of Cuban Occupation Medal (1915)
Cuban Pacification Medal (1909)
Mexican Service Medal (1917)
World War I Victory Medal with 8 campaign clasps (8 bronze service stars) (1919)
Foreign state decorations
Companion of the Order of St Michael and St George (United Kingdom)
French Legion of Honor (Commander)
Grand Officer of the Order of the Crown of Italy
Italian Order of Saints Maurice and Lazarus (Commander)
Italian War Merit Cross
French Croix de Guerre with 1 silver star, 1 silver palm, and 3 bronze palms
French Verdun Medal

Military badges, patches and tabs
	Senior Aviator
	Expert Rifle Marksmanship Badge
	French Pilot Wings
Mitchell's medals on display at the National Museum of the U.S. Air Force	

=== Mitchell's civilian awards ===
- U.S. Congressional Gold Medal (1946)

== Military societies ==
General Mitchell belonged to the following military societies and veteran organizations –

- Military Order of the Loyal Legion of the United States
- Military Order of Foreign Wars
- Military Order of the Carabao
- National Society of the Army of the Philippines (Merged with the Veterans of Foreign Service to form the Veterans of Foreign Wars in 1914.)
- American Legion

== Dates of promotion ==
Note – the date listed is the date the promotion was accepted by General Mitchell. The actual date of rank was usually a few days earlier. (Source – Army Register, 1926. p. 423.)

No pin insignia in 1898	Private, 1st Wisconsin Infantry: May 14, 1898
No pin insignia in 1898	Second Lieutenant, Signal Corps, Volunteer Army: June 8, 1898
	First Lieutenant, Signal Corps, Volunteer Army: March 4, 1899
No pin insignia in 1899	Second Lieutenant, Signal Corps, Volunteer Army: April 18, 1899
	First Lieutenant, Signal Corps, Volunteer Army: June 11, 1900
	First Lieutenant, Signal Corps, Regular Army: April 26, 1901
	Captain, Signal Corps, Regular Army: March 2, 1903
	Major, Signal Corps, Regular Army: July 1, 1916
	Lieutenant Colonel, Signal Corps, Regular Army: May 15, 1917
	Colonel, Signal Corps, Temporary: October 10, 1917
	Brigadier General, Air Service, Temporary: October 14, 1918
	Colonel, Signal Corps, Regular Army: July 1, 1920
	Brigadier General, Air Service, Temporary: July 16, 1920
	Colonel, Signal Corps, Regular Army: April 25, 1925 (Resigned February 1, 1926)

== Posthumous recognition ==
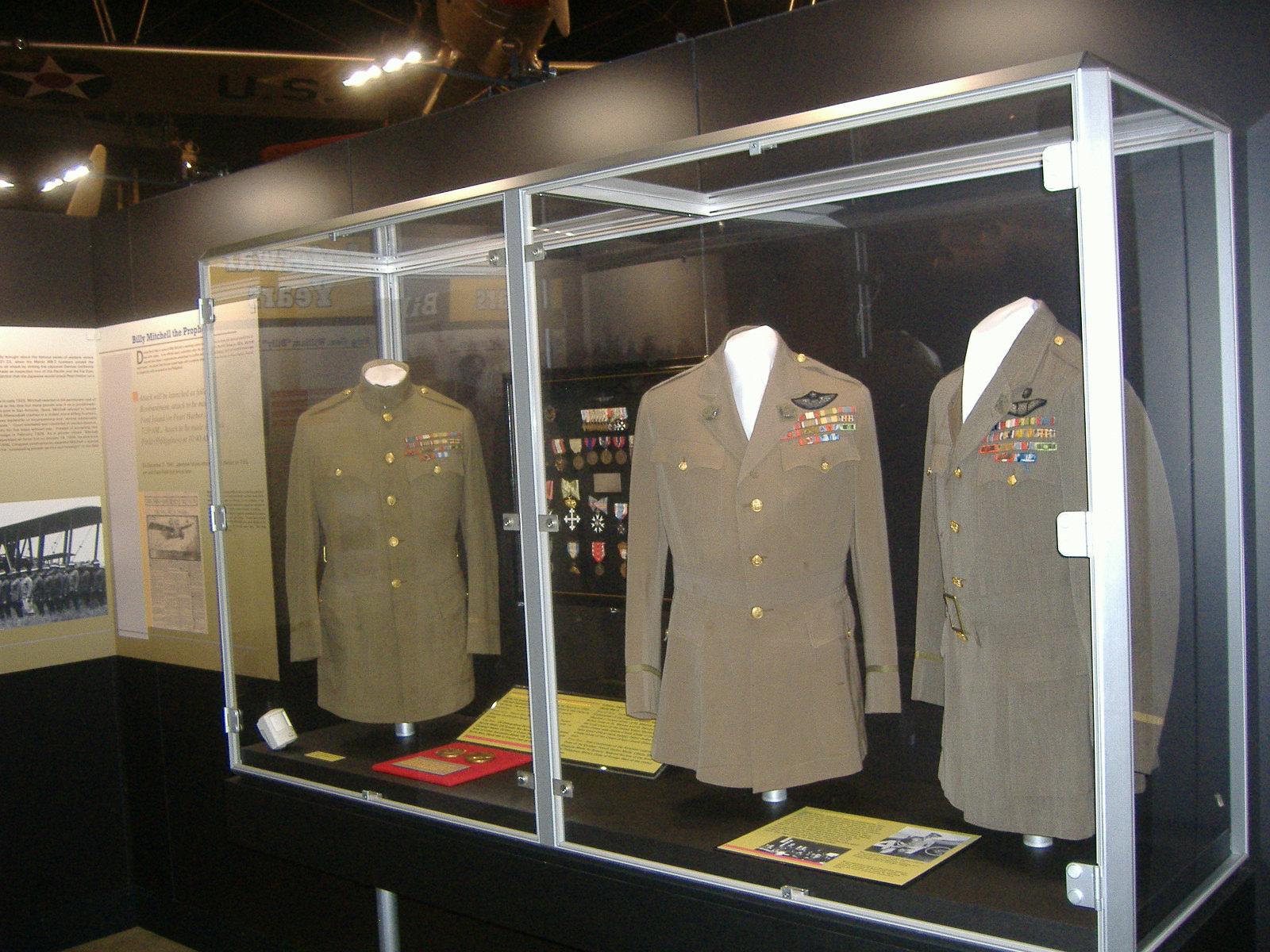
Mitchell's uniforms on display at the National Museum of the United States Air Force

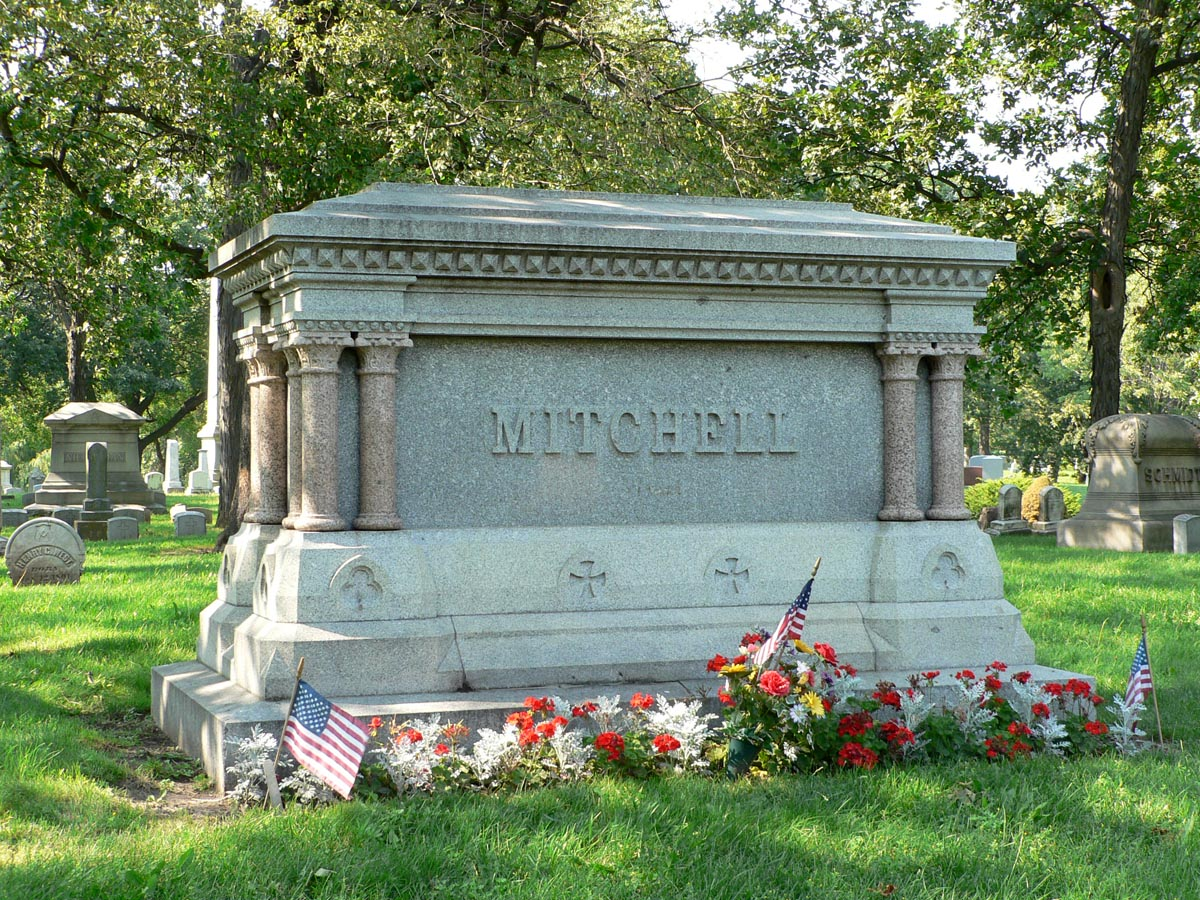
Mitchell family monument

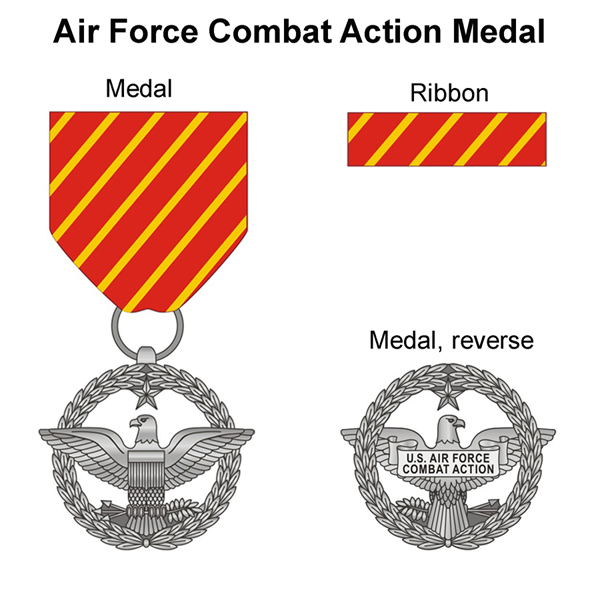
Obverse and reverse of the Air Force Combat Action Medal

Mitchell's concept of a battleship's vulnerability to air attack under "war-time conditions" was vindicated after his death. Air power was first shown to be decisive against a capital ship in war conditions during the Spanish Civil War: on May 29, 1937, Republican Government bombers attacked and damaged the German heavy cruiser Deutschland. This new dimension for aerial warfare preceded the attack on Taranto and Pearl Harbor by a good margin.

During World War II, many warships were sunk solely by air attack. The battleships Conte di Cavour, Duilio, Littorio, Arizona, Utah, Oklahoma, Prince of Wales, Repulse, Roma, Musashi, Tirpitz, Yamato, Schleswig-Holstein, Lemnos, Kilkis, Marat, Ise and Hyūga were all put out of commission or destroyed by aerial attack including bombs, air-dropped torpedoes and missiles fired from aircraft. Some of these ships were destroyed by surprise attacks in harbor, others were sunk at sea after vigorous defense. However, most of the sinkings were carried out by aircraft carrier-based planes, not by land-based bombers as envisioned by Mitchell. The world's navies had responded quickly to the Ostfriesland lesson.

- 1941: The North American B-25 Mitchell bomber, introduced in 1941, was named for Mitchell. Nearly 10,000 B-25s were produced, including the sixteen bombers which Lt. Colonel Jimmy Doolittle and his raiders used to bomb Tokyo and four other Japanese targets in April 1942.
- 1941: The main airport in Mitchell's hometown of Milwaukee was renamed General Mitchell Field in his honor; it is now known as Milwaukee Mitchell International Airport. The airport also houses the Mitchell Gallery of Flight museum
- 1942: President Franklin Roosevelt, in recognizing Mitchell's contributions to air power, petitioned the U.S. Congress to posthumously award Mitchell the Congressional Gold Medal, "in recognition of his outstanding pioneer service and foresight in the field of American military aviation." It was awarded in 1946.
- 1943: Walt Disney produced a film, Victory Through Air Power, which opened with a filmed quote from General Mitchell, and is dedicated to him. The movie is based on a book by Major Alexander P. de Seversky, and is an explanation of how long range bombing and concentration of air power could shorten World War II, explaining the logistics and strategies that would give the Allies the upper hand at that time, as the Axis would be unable to develop similar aircraft and strategies due to their own issues. This film was shown to British prime minister Winston Churchill and U.S. president Franklin Roosevelt at a conference in Quebec, and reportedly made an impact on the planning and production of U.S. war material at the insistence of Roosevelt.
- 1943: The unnamed "General" in the classic World War II movie A Guy Named Joe who gives the deceased pilot his new assignment, was "probably modeled after Billy Mitchell."
- 1944: The United States Navy named a troop transport as the USS General William Mitchell (AP-114).
- 1951: The Billy Mitchell Drill Team (BMDT) was founded as an Air Force ROTC Drill Team; it is a drill, ceremony and color guard team at the University of Florida.
- 1955: The Air Force Association passed a resolution calling for the voiding of Mitchell's court-martial. The Association named their Institute for Airpower Studies for the general; the current dean of the Mitchell Institute is Lt. Gen. David A. Deptula, USAF (Ret.).
- 1955: The motion picture The Court-Martial of Billy Mitchell, directed by Otto Preminger and starring Gary Cooper, portrays Mitchell's plight in a dramatic light.
- 1966: Mitchell was inducted into the National Aviation Hall of Fame.
- 1968: The United States Board on Geographic Names officially named Mount Billy Mitchell in the Chugach Mountains, near the city of Valdez in Southcentral Alaska. This was in recognition of his central role in overseeing the construction of the Washington-Alaska Military Cable and Telegraph System (WAMCATS) while he was stationed in the District of Alaska from 1900 to 1904.
- 1970: Mitchell was inducted into the International Air & Space Hall of Fame.
- 1971: Pipes and Drums, the Billy Mitchell Scottish, was created in Milwaukee to honor Mitchell and his ties to Scotland and Milwaukee.
- Billy Mitchell Airport in Cape Hatteras, North Carolina is named for Mitchell.
- Mitchell Hall, the cadet dining facility at the United States Air Force Academy, was dedicated in honor of Mitchell in 1959.
- William (Billy) Mitchell High School in Colorado Springs, Colorado, and Billy Mitchell Elementary School in Lawndale, California, are named after him.
- General Mitchell was honored at his alma mater, the George Washington University in Washington, D.C., with the naming of a large undergraduate residence building, William Mitchell Hall.
- The Civil Air Patrol cadet program includes an award called the General Billy Mitchell Award, signifying the rank of Cadet 2nd Lieutenant, and completion of several tests and essays. There is also a CAP "Billy Mitchell Squadron" in the LA Wing, based at Lakefront airport, New Orleans.
- The U.S. Air Force Pipe Band, which existed as a free-standing unit within the U.S. Air Force Band between 1960 and 1970, wore a tartan created in honor of Billy Mitchell.
- 1998: William Sanders wrote the alternate history story "Billy Mitchell's Overt Act". In the variant history depicted in the story, Mitchell managed to avoid the court-martial, and was still alive as an active service general in 1941. Being stationed in Hawaii, Mitchell correctly guessed the Japanese intentions and launched a preemptive strike on the oncoming Japanese carriers, and at the cost of his own life, several carriers were destroyed and disabled which prevented the Japanese Attack on Pearl Harbor.
- 1999: General Mitchell's portrait was put on a U.S. postage stamp. Although the 55-cent stamp met an airmail rate and portrayed a figure important to the development of aviation, it was not marked or issued as an airmail stamp. It also met the two-ounce first-class rate in effect at the time.
- Mitchell was named as the class exemplar at the United States Air Force Academy for the Class of 2001.
- 2003: The House voted to reauthorize the president to posthumously commission Mitchell as a major general in the Army (2003 HR2755). However, as the bill clearly notes, it did not pass the Senate, and therefore did not become law.
- 2006: On May 18, the U.S. Air Force unveiled two prototypes for new service dress uniforms, referencing the service's heritage. One, modeled on the United States Army Air Service uniform, was designated the "Billy Mitchell heritage coat" (the other was named for Hap Arnold). Ironically, the Air Service (including Mitchell) campaigned persistently against the high-collar blouse, which was the Army's regulation uniform coat of the time, because of its chafing effect on pilots' necks. In 1924, they succeeded and adopted the "turned-down" collar style blouse shown as the "Hap Arnold" uniform.
- 2007: The Air Force established and awarded the first Air Force Combat Action Medal (s), which is based on the insignia painted on Billy Mitchell's own aircraft which he flew during World War I.

== See also ==
- List of members of the American Legion
