= Charles C. Peterson =

American billiards player (1879–1962)

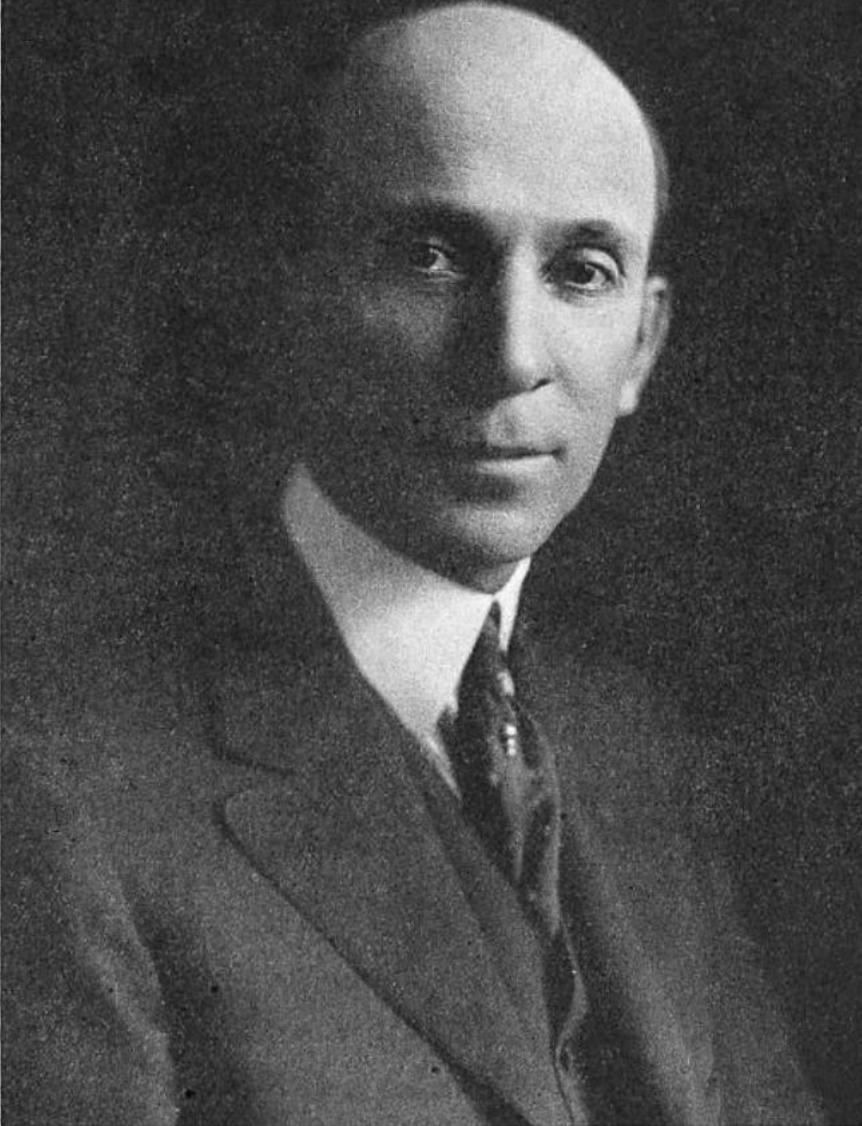
- Peterson in a 1921 publication
- Born: February 28, 1879; Milwaukee, Wisconsin, U.S.
- Died: June 23, 1962 (aged 83); Los Angeles, California, U.S.
- Occupation: Billiards player
- Military career
- Allegiance: United States
- Branch: Army
- Service years: 1898–1899
- Rank: Sergeant
- Unit: 1st Wisconsin Infantry Regiment
- Conflicts: Spanish–American War

Charles C. Peterson (February 28, 1879 – June 23, 1962) was an American billiards player. Known for his trick shots, he owned a billiard hall in St. Louis and was nicknamed the "Missionary of Billiards" for his widespread promotion of the sport. He was an inductee of the Billiard Congress of America Hall of Fame.

== Early life and military service ==
Peterson was born on February 28, 1879, in Milwaukee, to Anthony and Anthonette Peterson. An attendee of religious schools, he enlisted in the 1st Wisconsin Infantry Regiment of the United States Army, on April 26, 1898, and served in the Spanish–American War. He served for nine months, during which he gained his interest in billiards, as tournaments were hosted where he was stationed. By the end of his service, he was ranked a sergeant.

== Career ==
After the war, Peterson moved to St. Louis and began working at the Houser & Royal Billiard Parlors, a choice made over job offers in Brooklyn, Chicago, Cleveland, and Detroit. In 1909, he established his own billiard hall, which included 31 billiard tables, an amphitheater, and a bowling alley with eight lanes. He was an early supporter of women billiards players, hosting biweekly meetings of a women's billiards club at his hall.

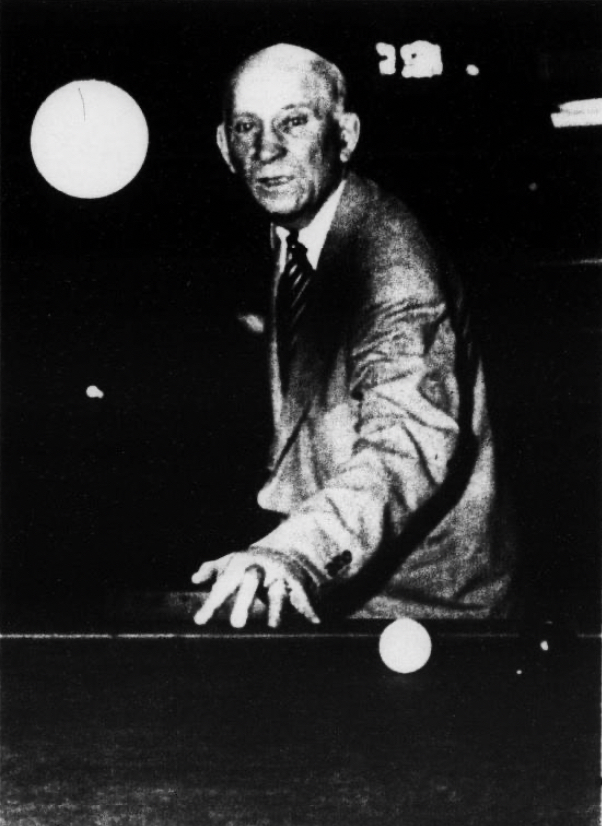
Peterson performing a trick shot in which he bounces a billiard ball, 1952 publication

As a billiards player, Peterson was known for his trick shots and won the Red Ball championship on multiple occasions. He represented the Billiard Congress of America in countrywide tours of colleges and clubs, with fellow billiards player Willie Hoppe, to perform trick shots and promote the sport. For this, he was nicknamed the "Missionary of Billiards". He also did so at military bases during World War II. His trick shots included making billiard balls jump each other and shooting a ball off the table and having the ball roll back onto it. He was said to have made every shot presented before him, and was billed as "Charles Show-Me-a-Shot-I-Can't-Make Peterson".

On August 16, 1930, Peterson played billiards inside a Curtiss T-32 Condor II airplane flown by British World War I Captain Frank Courtney, 4,000 feet (1,200 m) in the air and travelling at 100 miles per hour (160 km/h). At one point, Courtney flew to 7,000 feet (2,100 m) and traveled at 132 miles per hour (212 km/h), but lost the speed and elevation due to the cue balls vibrating too much for play. There were a total of four flights. In the first, thirty minutes long, Peterson scored 70 points in 42 seconds. The fourth flight, which was the official flight, departed from St. Louis Downtown Airport. He scored 100 points in 28.5 seconds, compared to his 26-second record on land. During the fourth flight, he also performed a trick shot in which he makes a three-cushion billiards shot – which requires hitting a ball after hitting the cushions at least three times – while balancing the red ball atop the cue ball. During the flights, Peterson and other passengers waved to pilots Dale Jackson and Forest O'Brine, who were in the midst of breaking a flight endurance record.

== Personal life and death ==
Peterson married Katherine Kleser, having three children with her. Besides billiards, he was an outdoorsman and played golf. He was intensely patriotic, carrying a small American flag in his pocket, which his mother gifted him following his 1898 enlistment. On national holidays, he would greet visitors of his hall with an American flag pin. He died on June 23, 1962, aged 83, in Los Angeles, of a heart attack, though his obituary in The New York Times says he died at age 82. In 1966, he, along with Ralph Greenleaf and Willie Hoppe, were posthumously inducted into the Billiard Congress of America Hall of Fame, with Peterson being part of the Meritorious Service category.
