= 1st Wisconsin Infantry Regiment (1898) =

U.S. Volunteer infantry regiment

- Flag of Wisconsin
- Active: May 14, 1898 – October 19, 1898
- Country: United States
- Branch: Infantry
- Size: Regiment
- Engagements: Spanish–American War

Commanders
- Colonel: Samuel Schadel

The 1st Wisconsin Infantry Regiment, reconstituted in 1898, was as an infantry regiment that served in the United States Army during the Spanish–American War. The regiment served out its term of service within the continental United States, and did not see action during the war.

== Service ==
The 1st Wisconsin was mustered into service on May 14, 1898, at Camp Harvey in Milwaukee, Wisconsin, with a strength of fifty officers and 976 enlisted men.

The regiment moved to Camp Cuba Libre in Jacksonville, Florida, and was assigned to the 2nd Brigade, 2nd Division of the 7th Army Corps commanded by Fitzhugh Lee. The corps was being trained for an intended assault on Havana, Cuba, when an armistice ended the fighting on August 12, 1898, though the war would officially continue until the signing of the Treaty of Paris on December 10, 1898.

The 1st Wisconsin was mustered out of service on October 19, 1898, in Wisconsin. At the time of mustering out, the unit consisted of forty-nine officers and 1,224 enlisted men. The 1st Wisconsin Volunteer Infantry is perpetuated by both the 127th Infantry Regiment and the 128th Infantry Regiment.

== Casualties ==
The 1st Wisconsin suffered 40 enlisted men who died of disease, plus 8 additional men who were discharged for disability or other causes.

== Commanders ==
- Colonel Samuel Schadel

== Notable people ==
- Matthew S. Dudgeon was a private in Co. G. After the war, he became a Wisconsin state legislator and was director of the Milwaukee Public Library for 20 years.
- Oscar R. Olson was adjutant of the regiment. After the war, he became a Wisconsin state senator.
- Charles C. Peterson was a sergeant in the regiment. After the war, he became a noted billiards player.

== See also ==
- Seventh Army Corps (Spanish–American War)
