= Saratoga Springs History Museum =

City museum in Saratoga Springs, New York

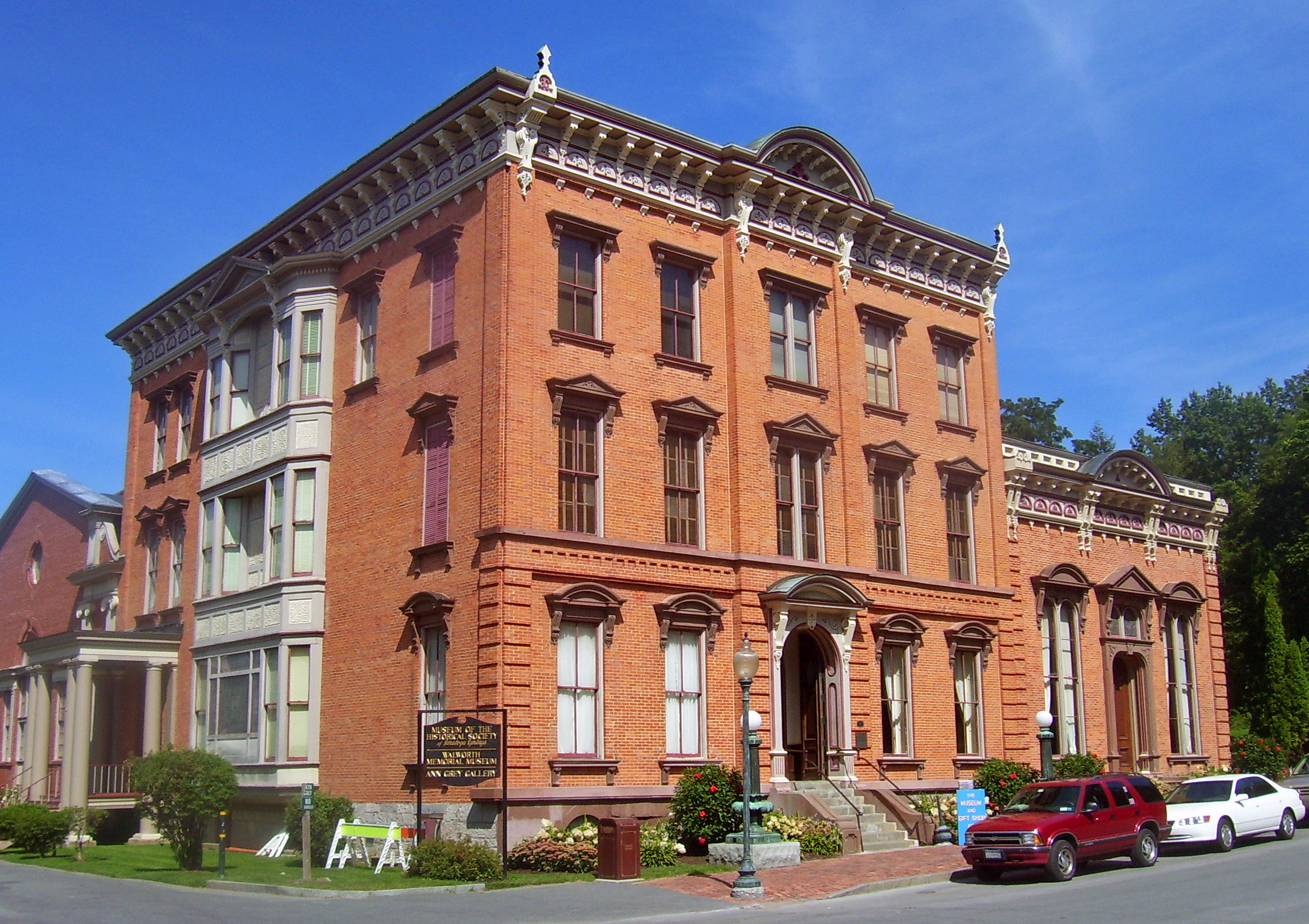
Canfield Casino, Congress Park.

The Saratoga Springs History Museum in Saratoga Springs, New York, United States, is located inside the historic Canfield Casino. The museum's collection focuses on the cultural history of Saratoga Springs.

== The Saratoga Springs History Museum ==
The Saratoga Springs History Museum was founded in October 1883 as "The Historical Society of Saratoga, including the Upper Hudson, Lake George and Lake Champlain." The first president was Joseph William Drexel The museum has been located in the Casino, built in 1870, since 1911 and is open to visitors year round. Its large collection of historical documents, photographs, artworks and objects relating to the history of Saratoga Springs is open to researchers and the general public. The museum's permanent collection is augmented by temporary exhibits.

The museum encompasses the Bolster Collection of historic photographs from the 19th and 20th centuries and the Walworth Memorial Museum, objects and records from the family of Reuben Hyde Walworth.

== Archival collections ==
The George S. Bolster Collection encompasses 375,000 negatives of photographs taken in and around the city of Saratoga Springs from 1855 to 1980 by a succession of commercial photographers. About three-quarters of the collection is the work of 20th-century photographer George S. Bolster, with the rest culled from the work of Harry B. Settle, Jesse S. Wooley, Gustave Lorey, Seneca Ray Stoddard, C.C. Cook, and H.C. Ashby.

The Beatrice Sweeney Archive contains thousands of documents and business records such as the Caffè Lena papers.

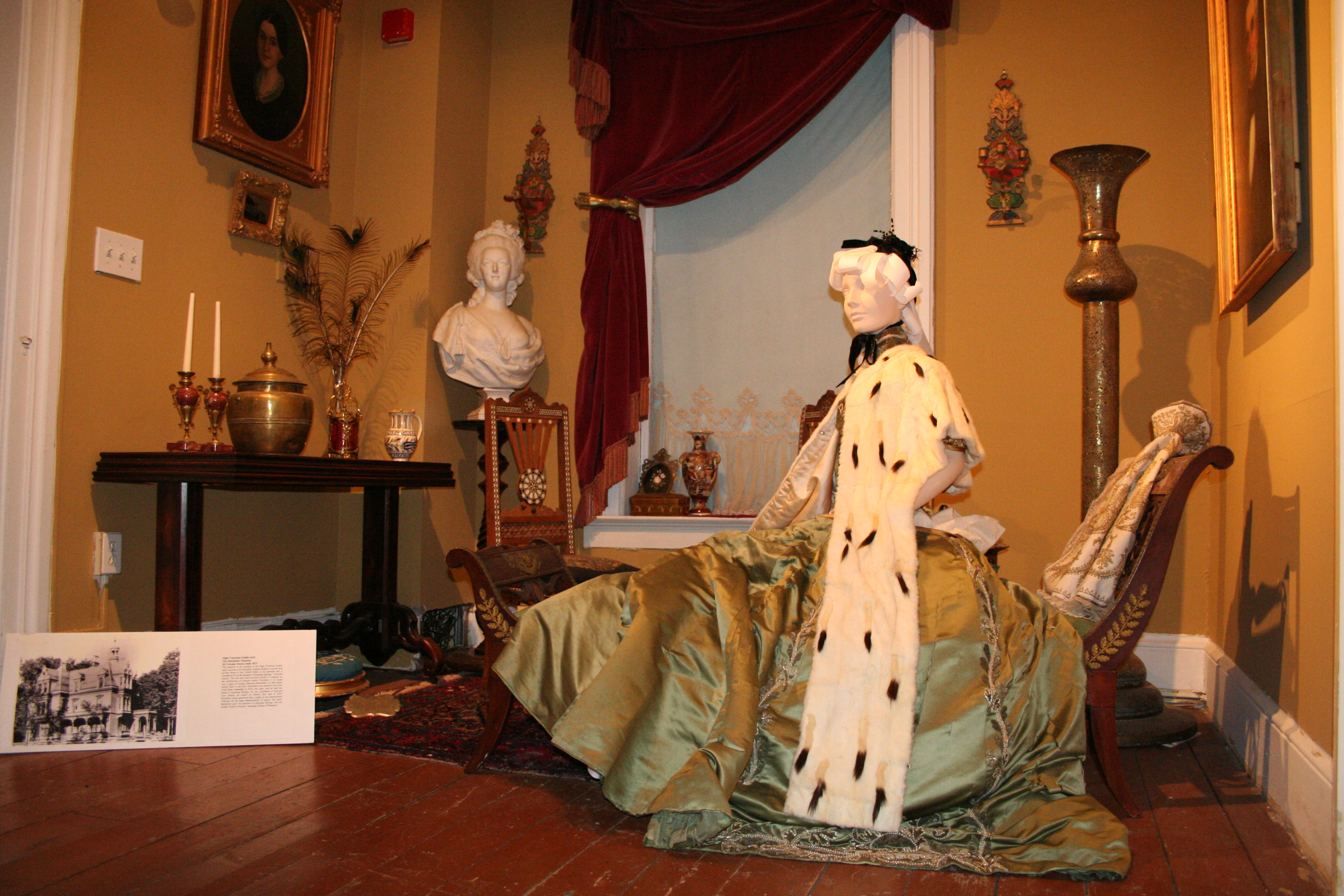
Batcheller Collection items.

The museum's holdings also include items from the George S. Batcheller Collection. George Sherman Batcheller (1837–1908) was a lawyer, diplomat, judge and politician whose career included serving in the New York State Assembly and as United States Ambassador to Portugal from 1890 to 1892. His mansion overlooking Congress Park has been restored, and some of his belongings are on display in the History Museum.

== Walworth Memorial Museum ==
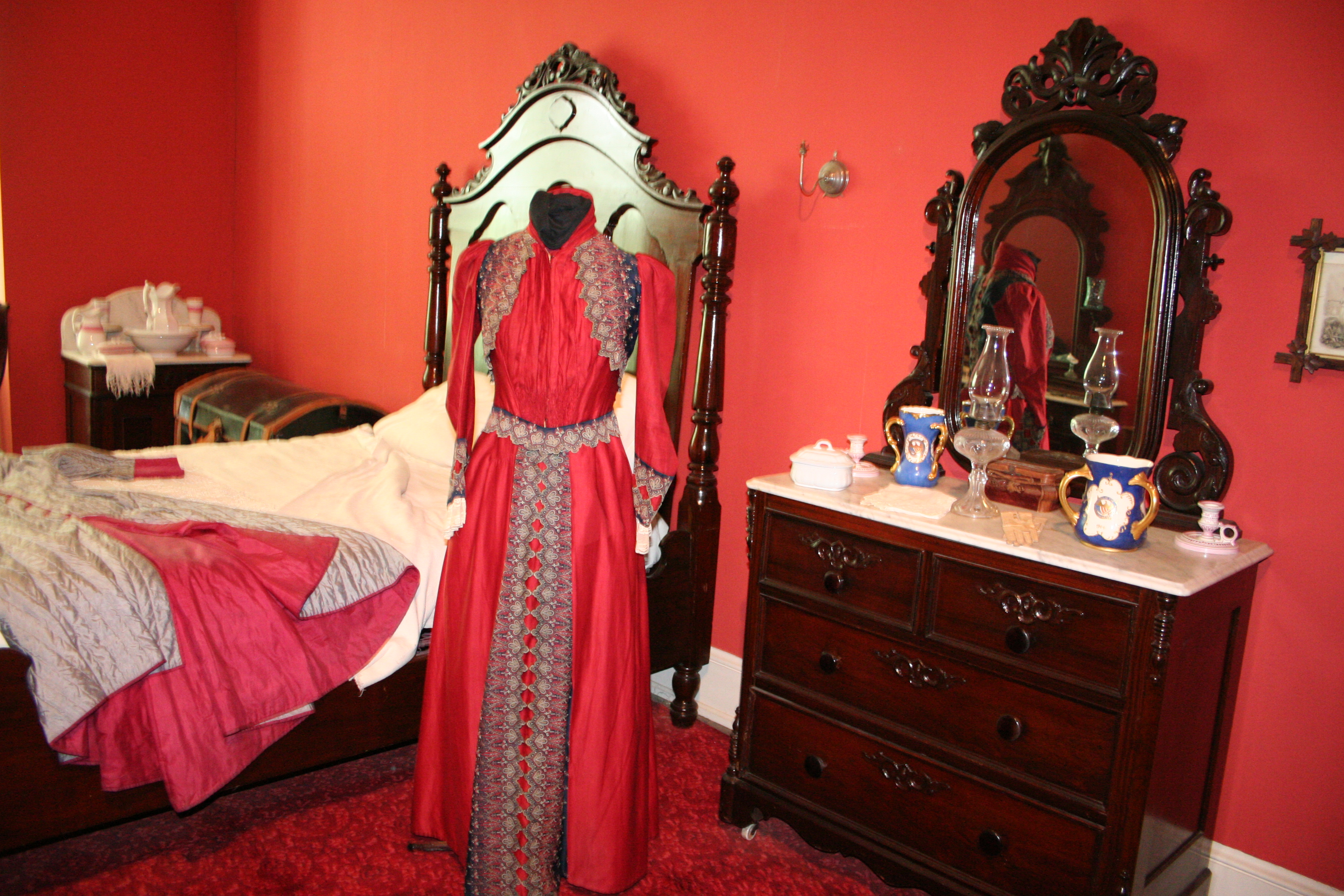
A Walworth Museum Room.

Seven rooms in the museum are devoted to the history of the Walworths, one of the most prominent families in 19th century New York. Patriarch Reuben Hyde Walworth (1788–1867) served as Chancellor of the State of New York from 1828 until the post was abolished in 1848. That same year he ran unsuccessfully for governor. His son Clarence Augustus Walworth (1820–1900) was a Catholic Redemptorist priest and his daughter in law Ellen Hardin Walworth (1832–1915) was a co-founder of the Daughters of the American Revolution.

== Video archives ==
Many of the lectures and programs sponsored by the museum are archived on its YouTube channel. Short videos about the museum and Saratoga Springs can also be viewed there.
