= George Batcheller =

George Batcheller may refer to:

- George R. Batcheller (1892–1938), American film producer
- George Sherman Batcheller (1837–1908), American soldier, politician, diplomat and jurist
