= DeWitt Clinton Hoyt =

American politician

Member of the New York State Assembly
- In office 1869–1869
- Preceded by: Alembert Pond
- Succeeded by: Seymour Ainsworth

Personal details
- Born: DeWitt Clinton Hoyt; August 25, 1824 Greenfield, New York, U.S.
- Died: October 24, 1898 (aged 74) Minneapolis, Minnesota, U.S.
- Resting place: Greenridge Cemetery, Saratoga Springs, New York
- Spouse: Cynthia Ann Smith

DeWitt Clinton Hoyt (August 25, 1824 – October 24, 1898) was an American politician, representing the 2nd District of Saratoga County in the New York State Assembly in 1869.

== Biography ==
DeWitt Clinton Hoyt was born in 1824 in Greenfield, Saratoga County, New York, the son of Caleb Miller Hoyt and Melinda P. Drake. In 1869, he was elected to the New York State Assembly, representing the 2nd District of Saratoga County. He died in 1898 in Minneapolis, Minnesota.

New York State Assembly
Preceded by Alembert Pond	New York State Assembly; Saratoga County, 2nd District; 1869	Succeeded by Seymour Ainsworth
