= Seymour Ainsworth =

American businessman (1821–1890)

Member of the New York State Assembly from the Saratoga County 2nd district
- In office January 1, 1870 – December 31, 1870
- Preceded by: DeWitt Clinton Hoyt
- Succeeded by: Joseph W. Hill

Personal details
- Born: May 17, 1821 Woodbury, Vermont, U.S.
- Died: December 22, 1890 (aged 69) Saratoga Springs, New York, U.S.
- Resting place: Greenridge Cemetery, Saratoga Springs, New York, U.S.
- Party: Democratic
- Occupation: Businessman, politician

Seymour Ainsworth (May 17, 1821 – December 22, 1890) was an American businessman born in Woodbury, Vermont, United States.

== Biography ==
Seymour Ainsworth, who died at his home in Saratoga Springs, December 22, 1890, in the sixty-ninth year of his age, was an interesting character and a most useful citizen of this village and county. He was born in Woodbury, Vermont, May 17, 1821, one of twelve children, all of whom lived to be more than fifty-five years of age. His scholastic education was confined to a few terms in the neighboring district schools, but his education in woodcraft, the use of the rifle and other outdoor sports were broad, leading him in after years to the business of dealing in products of Indian skill, which gained him an extensive acquaintance with Indian tribes from Maine to the Northwest. At the young age of fourteen he learned the trade of carpenter and carriage maker and at the age of nineteen and came to Saratoga Springs to begin business for himself, he was employed for several years in and about the Union Hall of which he subsequently became one of the proprietors. He engaged in a variety of enterprises and was instrumental in the erection of more edifices of a public and private nature than any other man in Saratoga.

Ainsworth gained an international reputation in a business for which he was well fitted-that of selling articles of Indian manufacture, such as deer-skin moccasins, porcupine quill and moose hair embroideries, basket work, bows and arrows, and snow shoes. He monopolized the entire product of several Indian tribes and for a considerable time had the entire product of the grass which is used by the Indians in their basket and fan work. He had many inventions and at different times nearly thirty patents were granted him for devices and processes connected with his many lines of business. Perhaps the most valuable of these was his process for manufacturing feather fans, which gave him a practical monopoly in the production of ostrich feather fans. For a number of years he furnished A. T. Stewart, Lord & Taylor, and other large houses with all the feather fans they sold.

In 1865 he formed a copartnership with W. H. McCaffrey and purchased the High Rock spring which he greatly improved; the completion of the improvement being marked by a public meeting of citizens which was addressed by Chancellor Walworth, William L. Stone, esq., and others.

== Politics ==
In politics Ainsworth was a Democrat and held various public offices in the town and village government. He was the first assistant assessor of internal revenue for his district under the laws of the United States. He was a member of the New York State Assembly (Saratoga Co., 2nd D.) in 1870.

== Sources ==
- OUR COUNTY AND ITS PEOPLE, A DESCRIPTIVE AND BIOGRAPHICAL RECORD OF SARATOGA COUNTY, NEW YORK PREPARED AND PUBLISHED UNDER THE AUSPICES OF THE SARATOGIAN THE BOSTON HISTORY COMPANY, PUBLISHERS 1899

New York State Assembly
| Preceded by DeWitt C. Hoyt | New York State Assembly; Saratoga County, 2nd District; 1870 | Succeeded by Joseph W. Hill |
