= Tabor B. Reynolds =

American politician

Tabor Burton Reynolds (April 8, 1821 – July 3, 1901) was an American physician and politician from New York.

== Life ==
Reynolds was born on April 8, 1821, in Wilton, New York, the son of Dr. Henry Reynolds and Mary Emerson.

Reynolds initially studied medicine in his father's office. He then studied under Doctors Marsh and Armsby in Albany. He attended the Albany Medical College at the same time, graduating from there in 1842 with a Doctor of Medicine degree. He returned to Wilton afterwards and practiced medicine with his father. After his father died in 1857, he began practicing medicine with his younger brother John Henry until the latter's death in 1870.

Reynolds was Town Superintendent of Schools from 1847 to 1852. He then served as town supervisor from 1856 to 1858. He was a Democrat until 1855, at which point he joined the American Party. In 1857, he was elected to the New York State Assembly with support from the American and Democratic parties, representing the Saratoga County 2nd District. He served in the Assembly in 1858.

Reynolds became a Republican following the outbreak of the American Civil War. He was re-elected town supervisor in 1863 and served in that office until the end of 1867. During that time, he was active in securing enlistments, filling the county's quota of men, and making provisions for the soldiers. In the 1867 election, he was elected county sheriff, an office he held until the end of 1870. He then moved to Saratoga Springs to work exclusively as a physician.

An active member of the Saratoga County Medical Society, Reynolds became its president in 1857. He became a Permanent Member of the New York State Medical Society in 1858. In 1872, he became president of the Union Medical Association of Washington, Warren, and Saratoga Counties. In 1884, he was a charter member and organizer of the New York State Medical Association. He was also a member of the American Medical Association. In 1878, he was appointed Examining Surgeon for Pensions at Saratoga Springs. He resigned from that office in 1886. In 1889, he was appointed to a Board of three Examining Surgeons in Saratoga Springs.

In 1843, Reynolds married Sarah Ann Emerson, daughter of Lyndes Emerson. They had no children, and she died from a lingering illness in 1874.

Reynolds died from heart failure at his home on July 3, 1901. He was buried in Greenridge Cemetery in Saratoga Springs.

New York State Assembly
Preceded by Samuel J. Mott	New York State Assembly; Saratoga County, 2nd District; 1858	Succeeded by George Sherman Batcheller
