= George S. Bolster =

American photographer

- Born: 1913
- Died: 1989 (aged 75–76)
- Citizenship: America
- Education: St. Peter's Academy
- Occupation: Photographer

George S. Bolster (1913–1989) was an American photographer from Saratoga Springs, New York. Bolster is noted as the creator of the George S. Bolster Collection of 375,000 negatives, chiefly from the Saratoga Springs area from the period 1855–1980, taken by himself and other photographers. The collection is now in the Saratoga Springs History Museum.

Bolster was born in Saratoga Springs in 1913 and exhibited an early interest in photography. He graduated from St. Peter's Academy in Saratoga Springs and opened a photography studio. In 1958 he took over the business of another well-known Saratoga Springs photographer, Harry B. Settle. Settle's collection contained negatives by J. S. Wooley, Gustave Lorey, Seneca Ray Stoddard, C.C. Cook, and H.C. Ashby in addition to Settle's own work. To this Bolster added a large collection he acquired from another photographer, Joe Deuel, plus his own numerous photos of the Saratoga scene. Bolster died in 1989 and willed his collection to the Saratoga Springs History Museum.

== Personal ==
George Bolster married Helen Elizabeth Baker (1912–2011) in 1938 in Saratoga Springs. The couple had two children, a daughter, Suzanne and a son Frederick Baker Bolster. They are buried in Greenridge Cemetery in Saratoga Springs.
