= William Leete Stone Sr. =

American historian (1792/1793–1844)

William Leete Stone
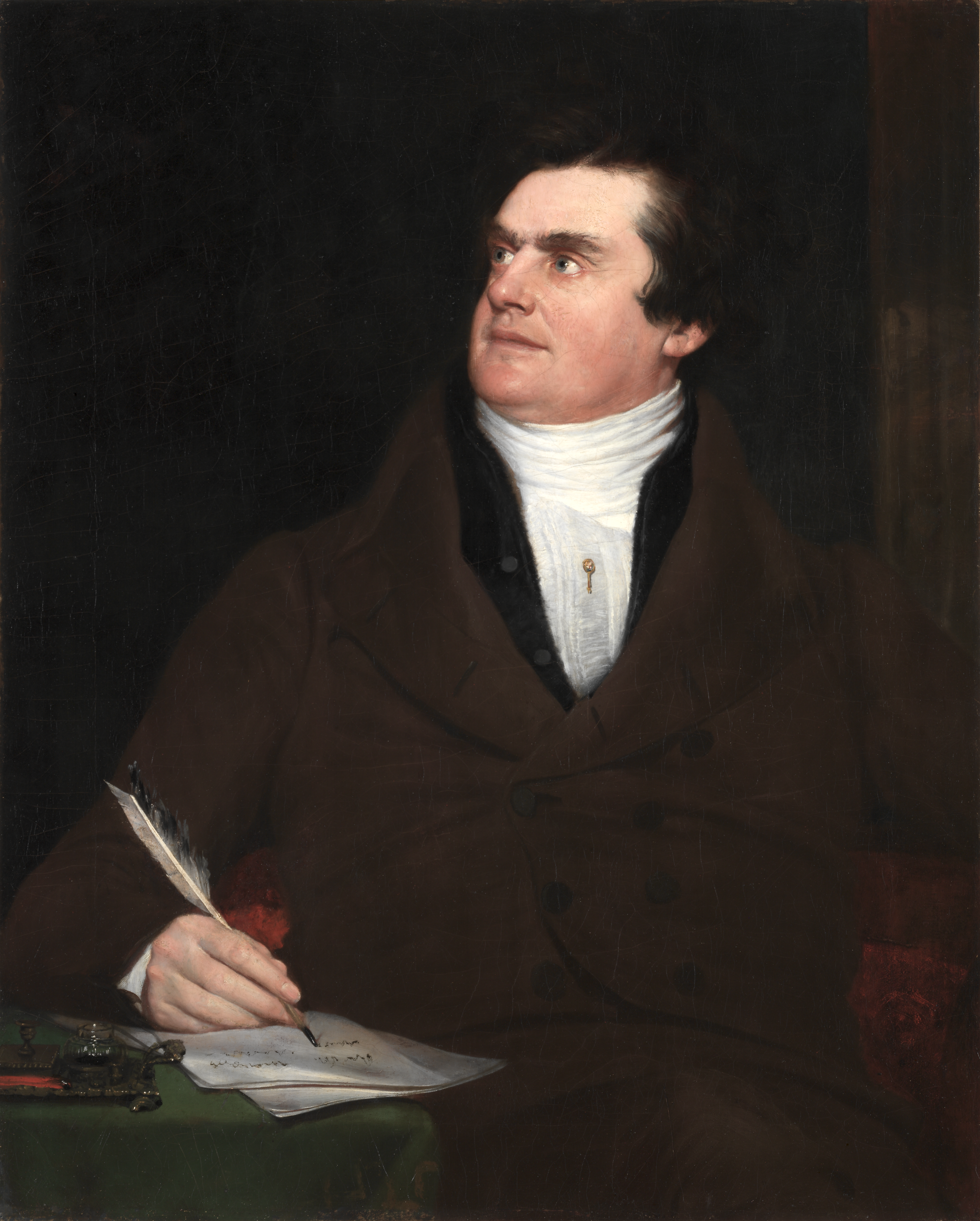
- Portrait by William Page, c. 1839

Superintendent of public schools of New York City
- In office c. 1840s–1844

United States Minister to the Hague
- In office 1841–1841
- President: William Henry Harrison; John Tyler

Personal details
- Born: 20 April 1792 or 1793 New Paltz, New York or Esopus, New York
- Died: August 15, 1844 (aged 51 or 52) Saratoga Springs, New York
- Resting place: Greenridge Cemetery
- Spouse: Susannah Wayland
- Children: William Leete Stone Jr.
- Education: Self-educated; Brown University (A.M., honorary, 1825)
- Occupation: Historian; journalist; editor; publisher
- Known for: Editor of the Commercial Advertiser; Early historian of Native American leaders; Abolition and colonization advocacy
- Nickname: Colonel Stone

William Leete Stone (20 April 1792 or 1793 – 15 August 1844), known as Colonel Stone, was an influential journalist, publisher, author, and public official in New York City. His name also appears as "Leet".

== Early life ==
Stone was born 20 April 1792 in New Paltz, New York or 1793 in Esopus, New York. His father, William, was a soldier of the Revolution and later a Presbyterian clergyman, descended from colonial Connecticut Governor William Leete. His mother was Tamsin Graves.

In 1808, the family moved to Sodus, New York, where Stone worked on the family farm. His experiences in this wilderness environment later influenced his frontier tales.

== Early career ==
At age 17, Stone became a printer in the office of the Federalist in Cooperstown, New York. In 1813, he was editor of the American in Herkimer, New York, where Thurlow Weed worked under him. He later edited the Northern Whig in Hudson, New York, and in 1817 the Daily Advertiser in Albany, New York.

In 1818, Stone succeeded Theodore Dwight as editor of the Hartford Mirror. While in Hartford, he collaborated with Jonathan Mayhew Wainwright, Samuel G. Goodrich ("Peter Parley"), and Isaac Toucey in editing a literary magazine called The Knights of the Round Table. He also edited The Lounger, a humorous and literary periodical.

== Commercial Advertiser ==
In 1821, Stone became editor and part owner of the New York Commercial Advertiser, a post he held for the remainder of his life. He became known for his literary criticism, which led to a famous libel suit by novelist James Fenimore Cooper over reviews of Home as Found and History of the Navy.

Stone used the Commercial Advertiser to advocate gradual abolition of slavery by act of Congress, in tandem with colonization efforts through the American Colonization Society. He served as president of the New York Colonization Society and introduced a gradual emancipation plan at the 1825 Baltimore convention. However, he opposed the immediate abolitionists of the American Anti-Slavery Society, and has been described as one of the leading critics who fueled the Anti-abolitionist riots (1834).

== Other public roles ==
=== Greek independence ===
In 1824, Stone supported the Greek War of Independence alongside Edward Everett and Samuel G. Howe, helping to rally American sympathy.

In 1825, he joined Thurlow Weed in accompanying Lafayette on a Hudson River steamboat trip during the general’s U.S. tour. That year, Brown University awarded him an honorary A.M. degree.

=== Freemasonry and controversy ===
Stone was a Freemason but became a critic after the William Morgan disappearance. In 1832, he published Letters on Masonry and Anti-Masonry addressed to John Quincy Adams, arguing that Masonry had outlived its usefulness.

=== Education and civic work ===
Known popularly as “Colonel Stone” (having served on Governor De Witt Clinton’s staff), he was appointed the first superintendent of public schools in New York City. In 1844, shortly before his death, he debated Archbishop John Hughes over the use of the Bible in public schools.

He was active in charitable associations, supporting education for the deaf, reform for juvenile delinquents, and missionary work among Native Americans. He was later made a chief of the Seneca Nation.

=== Historical scholarship ===
In 1838, Stone introduced a resolution in the New-York Historical Society urging the recovery of colonial records from England and the Netherlands. This initiative led to the appointment of John Romeyn Brodhead as a state historian, resulting in the publication of the New York Colonial Documents.

Stone’s biographies of Joseph Brant (1838) and Red Jacket (1841) were pioneering works on Native American leaders.

=== Diplomatic appointment ===
In 1841, President William Henry Harrison appointed Stone U.S. minister to the Hague, though he was soon recalled by President John Tyler.

== Personal life ==
Stone married Susannah Wayland, sister of Francis Wayland, president of Brown University. Their only son, William Leete Stone Jr., became a historian of the American Revolution.

== Death ==
Stone died on 15 August 1844 in Saratoga Springs, New York. He was buried in Greenridge Cemetery.

== Works ==
- History of the Great Albany Constitutional Convention of 1821 (Albany, 1822)
- Narrative of the Grand Erie Canal Celebration (New York, 1825)
- Letters on Masonry and Anti-Masonry (New York, 1832)
- Tales and Sketches: Such As They Are (2 vols., New York, 1834)
- Matthias and His Impostures (New York, 1833)
- The Mysterious Bridal and Other Tales (3 vols., New York, 1835)
- Maria Monk and the Nunnery of the Hotel Dieu (New York, 1836)
- Ups and Downs in the Life of a Distressed Gentleman (New York/Boston, 1836)
- The Witches: A Tale of New-England (Bath, NY, 1837)
- Letter to Doctor A. Brigham, on Animal Magnetism (New York, 1837)
- Life of Joseph Brant-Thayendanegea (2 vols., New York, 1838)
- Life and Times of Red-Jacket (New York, 1841)
- The Poetry and History of Wyoming (New York & London, 1841)
- Uncas and Miantonomoh (New York, 1842)
- Border Wars of the American Revolution (2 vols., 1843)
- The life and times of Sir William Johnson, bart. (2 vols., New York, 1865)
- The Centennial History of New York City: from the discovery to the present day (New York, 1876)

== See also ==
- Robert Matthews (religious figure), known as Matthias the Prophet
