= 115th New York Infantry Regiment =

- New York flag
- Active: 26 August 1862 to 17 June 1865
- Country: United States
- Allegiance: Union
- Branch: Infantry
- Engagements: Battle of Harpers Ferry, Battle of Olustee, Battle of Cold Harbor

Commanders
- Notable commanders: Col. Simeon Sammons, Col. Nathan J. Johnson; Lt.Col. George S. Batcheller, Lt.Col. Nathan J. Johnson, Lt.Col. Ezra L. Walrath; Maj. Patrick H. Cowam, Maj. Ezra L. Walrath, Maj. Egbert B. Savage

The 115th New York Infantry Regiment, nicknamed the "Iron Hearted Regiment", was a volunteer regiment recruited during the American Civil War from the counties of Fulton, Hamilton, Montgomery, and Saratoga, New York.

== Content ==
"In writing the history of the 115th N. Y Volunteer Infantry, we record the acts of a noble body of men, whose deeds are already written in blood, and inscribed high up in the roll of fame. The regiment was raised in the counties of: Saratoga, Montgomery, Fulton, and Hamilton, and mustered into the United States service on 26th day of August, 1862, by Capt. Edgerton, U. S. A., at Fonda the place of rendezvous of the regiment. The field staff and captains were as follows" (Beers, 1878)

=== Officers of the 115th NY Volunteer Regiment ===
- Sammons, Colonel Simeon
- Batcheller, Lieutenant-Colonel George S.
- Cowan, Major Patrick Henry
- Horton, Adjutant Thomas R.
- McMartin, Quartermaster Martin
- Sutton, Surgeon Richard H.
- Ingersoll, Assistant Surgeon William H.
- Clemons, Chaplain Sylvester V.

CAPTAINS:

- Company A: Garret Vanderveer
- Company B: John P. Kneeskern
- Company C: William H. McKittrick
- Company D: Sidney Lingenfelter
- Company E: William H. Shaw
- Company F: Walton W. French
- Company G: Egbert B. Savage
- Company H: Solomon P. Smith
- Company I: Ezra L. Walrath
- Company K: William Smith

With the above officers, together with a full complement of lieutenants and ten hundred and forty enlisted men, the regiment broke camp at Fonda on 29 August, and was forwarded to the seat of war as soon as possible, arriving at Dandy Hook, Md. on the Baltimore and Ohio R. R., on 1 September, where the regiment was furnished with arms, but very little ammunition. It then moved on to Harper's Ferry, Va., where it was assigned to guard duty along the Shenandoah Valley R. R., with headquarters at Charlestown, Virginia.

The regiment performed guard duty faithfully, until a few days before the surrender of Harper's Ferry, when it and others were ordered to concentrate at that place. On the way to the Ferry James English, a member of Company D, was wounded in the hand, by the accidental discharge of a musket, necessitating amputation at the wrist; he was the first man wounded in the regiment. On arriving at, or near Harper's Ferry, the regiment was encamped on Bolivar Heights, in the rear of the village. From this point it performed picket duty, and while so engaged, John Hubbard, of Co. A, was wounded by a guerrilla. On the 12th, Companies E and A were ordered to report to Col. Tom Ford, in command of Maryland Heights, and upon doing so, were ordered to proceed up the Potomac, to the old "John Brown" school-house, and form a skirmish line from the river as far up the mountain as possible, the left resting on the river.

Early the next morning the two companies were ordered back to Ford's headquarters, and from there to Elk Ridge, at the Lookout, on the highest peak of the mountain. Here for the first time members of the 115th regiment met the enemy in deadly combat. After several hours fighting, and holding their position, the two companies were ordered to evacuate the place, and report to Gen. Miles' headquarters, which they did very reluctantly, and not until they had received the third order. Company E had one man wounded. About this time Company K moved up, and, in a few minutes its captain was carried to the rear, having been wounded in the thigh by a minie-ball. Upon nearing the foot of the mountain, at what was known as Maryland Heights, Companies E and A met the remainder of the regiment, who congratulated them upon their safe return.

The regiment returned to camp on Bolivar Heights. The troops were kept moving to and fro until the morning of the 15th, when General Miles made one of the most cowardly and disgraceful surrenders recorded in the annals of American history.

Eleven thousand men, armed and equipped in the best style, with plenty of ammunition, holding one of the most defensible positions in the United States, were ignominiously surrendered, instead of aiding to surround Lee's, Longstreet's, Hill's and Jackson's corps where there was no possible way of escape. Thus the Union army was reduced, and eleven thousand as good fighting men as ever shouldered a musket were doomed to bear the taunts of their enemies, at home and abroad, as "Harper's Ferry cowards." But every regiment that was obliged to participate in that farce, and whose honor was sold by the commanding officer, has, upon bloody fields, won bright laurels, and vindicated its soldierly character. By the good graces of the rebel generals, who had the captured army as an "elephant on their hands," the prisoners were paroled the next day, and allowed to depart in peace, which they did with sorrowing hearts.

The regiment returned to Annapolis, Maryland, and thence went to Chicago, where it went into camp on the Cook county fair ground, which was called "Camp Tyler," after the general in command of the troops around the city. During the stay of the 115th in Chicago its duties were about the same as those of troops in garrison, but the men were allowed rather more liberties than regular soldiers on duty. While at Chicago, the weather being very bad most of the time, and the men not on fatigue duty enough to give them healthy exercise, malarial fever caused the death of quite a number.

About 20 November 1862, the regiment was ordered to proceed to Washington. The capital was reached about 23 November, and at the same time the soldiers of the 115th were exchanged and marched over to Arlington Heights. There they were supposed to go into winter quarters, but by the time quarters were built the regiment was ordered out again, and kept in motion between Arlington, Fairfax, Hunter's creek, Alexandria and Yorktown, where it embarked on the steamer "Matanzas," 23 January 1863, and arrived at Hilton Head, S. C., Department of the South, about 26 January.

Here the regiment was divided into detachments for post, camp and outpost duty. Companies E and D were detailed to garrison Battery Mitchell, an outpost on Scull creek. Company B was stationed at, Saybrook, and other companies at different points on and around Hilton Head Island, until 28 May, when the different detachments were relieved and the regiment was again a unit at Hilton Head. On 2 June, Companies E and B were, by order of General Chatfield, detailed for special field duty, and went with other troops up May River, S. C., and burned the town of Bluffton. About 27 June, the regiment was moved to the city of Beaufort, S. C., some twelve miles up Beaufort river, where it went into camp. After remaining here a while and suffering severely from malaria, incident to the dull routine life of the camp, the regiment was again divided into detachments and sent to do outpost and picket duty on Beaufort, Port Royal and other islands adjacent to them.

On 20 December, the regiment embarked on transports for the old camp at Hilton Head, where it was attached to Gen. T. Seymour's "ill-starred" Florida expedition. The force left Hilton Head on 5 February 1864, reached Jacksonville on the evening of 7 February, and occupied the city without opposition. During the night of 8 February, the expedition reached Camp Finnegan, about twelve miles from Jacksonville, capturing a battery of six guns, a quantity of small arms, etc., and a large amount of provisions, upon which the boys feasted until next day, when, with well filled haversacks, they moved towards Tallahassee, reaching and occupying Baldwin without opposition, and reaching Barber's Plantation during the night. The next day the troops advanced to Sanderson's Station, where they burned the railroad depot filled with corn, and several resin and turpentine factories, and tore up considerable railroad track, burning ties and other property belonging to the rebels. By order of Gen. Seymour, the army fell back to Barber's Plantation and remained there until 19 February.

During this time the 115th, a part of the 4th Massachusetts cavalry and a section of the Third R. I. Flying Artillery were ordered to proceed to Callahan, a station on the Fernandina and Cedar Keys railroad, and capture whatever they might find, which was one pony, seven bushels of sweet potatoes, and one or two Florida hogs, of the kind that need to have knots tied in their tails to prevent their getting through cracks. Returning to camp, weary, footsore and hungry, the boys of the 115th were allowed to rest about one day, when the whole command broke camp early on the morning of 20 February, for the disastrous field of Olustee, known by the rebels as Ocean Pond.

Upon arriving on the field the order of battle was formed, with the 115th on the extreme right of the infantry line, and the troops ordered to move forward, which they did with a steadiness that showed the 15,000 rebels that they had work to do. Upon arriving on a rise of ground between where the line was formed and the rebel position, the advancing force received a murderous fire, at which the colored troops on the extreme left broke very badly. The white troops upon the left began to double up on the 115th, but order was soon restored. About this time the rebels made a charge upon the Union right, which was repulsed by the 115th, who sent the enemy back over their works with heavy loss. The combat continued to rage with fury until the supply of ammunition on both sides gave out, and, night coming on, both parties were willing to call it a drawn battle; but Gen. Seymour, by ordering a retreat, gave the rebels to understand that he abandoned the contest. Upon this occasion Gen. Seymour took occasion to publicly compliment the 115th, giving it the honor and praise of saving his little army from total annihilation, and naming it the "Ironhearted Regiment." The regiment lost over one-half its number in killed, wounded and missing. Col. Sammons was wounded in the foot at the commencement of the battle. Capt. Vanderveer was mortally wounded, and died in a few days. Lieuts. Tompkins and Shaffer were killed, besides many of the best non-commissioned officers and men.

On leaving Olustee the expedition retraced its steps toward Jacksonville, where the 115th did picket and camp duty until 9 February, when the force embarked on transports for Palatka, Fla., about one hundred miles up the St. John's river from Jacksonville. Here the troops rested, and nothing of interest transpired. On 4 April, they again embarked on transports for Hilton Head, S. C., making a few hours' stop at Jacksonville, and arriving at their destination on the evening of 16 April. On 18 April the regiment sailed for Gloucester Point, Va., reaching that place on 21 April, and was attached to the 10th Army Corps. On 4 May it was attached to the Army of the James, under Gen. B. F. Butler. The army moved up the James river to Bermuda Hundred, and on 7 May, the 115th participated and suffered severely in the ill-fated battle of Chesterfield Heights, Va., losing about eighty in killed, wounded and missing, From this time to 16 May the regiment was marching, fighting, picketing, etc. On the morning of that day the disastrous battle of Drury's Bluff was fought. and the 115th regiment again brought into requisition under the immediate supervision of Gen. Adelbert Ames, who complimented it for its bravery and skillful movements, which saved Butler's army from total rout.

On 17 May the regiment went into camp at Hatcher's Run. From this time it was on picket duty all the time to 28 May, when it marched to City Point, and embarked on board the steamer "De Molay," for White House, Va., landing there on 31 May at 4 P. M. The 115th took up the line of march for Cold Harbor, Va., reaching that place on 1 June, at 3:30, P. M., and immediately, with the rest of the brigade, charged the enemy's works, this regiment capturing two hundred and fifty men with their arms and equipment. Here the regiment was again complimented for bravery by Gen. Devens.

From that time to 12 June, the regiment was under a continuous fire day and night. During the night of 12 June it marched for White House Landing, which place was reached at 6 A. M. the following morning. Next day the regiment embarked for City Point, landed at Powhattan, on the James, and marched the rest of the way. On the 23rd it moved up in front of Petersburgh, Va. From this time the regiment was in the trenches before Petersburgb, to 29 July, when Gen. Turner's division, to which the 115th was attached, moved to the left, to assist Burnside's 9th corps in the explosion of the mine, and charge upon the enemy's works. This occurred at 5 o'clock, on the morning of 30 July. The 115th again displayed its courage and cool bravery here by standing as a wall of fire between the advancing Rebels, and the partially demoralized 9th corps, and was again complimented by both Gens. Burnside and Turner.

From Petersburgh the regiment marched to near City Point, and then to Bermuda Hundred, losing several men by sun stroke, as the weather was extremely hot, and the roads dry and dusty. Up to this time the regiment had been under fire for 37 days, and needed rest, which was had at Hatch's farm, until, on the evening of 13 August, the regiment broke camp and marched to Deep Bottom, on the north side of the James river, which was reached at 7 o'clock, A. M., on 14 August. That day and the next were occupied in marching and counter marching. On 16 August the enemy were found strongly posted at Charles City Court House, where fighting began at once and continued until the evening of 18 August, when the 115th was deployed and covered the retreat of the Union forces. In this affair the regiment lost eighty-four killed, wounded and missing.

On 20 August it returned to the old camp at Bermuda, with only one hundred and twenty men fit for duty. Comparative rest was the happy lot of the decimated regiment until 28 August, when it marched to Petersburgh again and occupied the trenches in front of that city. The regiment had a little rest, doing only trench and camp duty until 28 September, when it broke camp and marched to the north side of the James. On 29 September the 115th participated in the capture of two redoubts on Chafin's farm, known by some as Spring Hill. Here the losses of the regiment were very severe, among the dead being the loved and lamented Capt. W. H. McKittrick, of Co. C. During this engagement in charges, counter charges, victories and repulses, the enemy lost three times the number that the 115th did.

From this time to 27 October, the regiment was doing picket duty most of the time. On that day a reconnaissance was made in force on the Darbytown road, in front of Richmond, the 115th taking a prominent part in charging the rebel works, and losing quite heavily. Among the number killed was Sergeant lde of Company F., the idol of his comrades. Returning to camp, the regiment had five days comparative rest. On 8 December, the 115th embarked on board the propeller "Haze," and participated in the abortive attempt to capture Fort Fisher, N. C. In the afternoon of 30 December, the regiment debarked at Jones' Landing, on the James river, Va., and just after dark was again in the old camp on Chafin's farm.

On 4 January 1865, the 115th again embarked on board the Propeller "DeMolay," on its second expedition against the keystone of the confederacy. The whole force was under command of Gen. Alfred H. Terry. The troops landed at Flay Pond battery, a short distance north of Fort Fisher, on the 13th at 9 A. M. The 115th lost but two or three men in landing. At 3 P. M. of the 15th, the grand charge was made upon the fort, the 115th bearing a noble part in its capture, and being again complimented by General Terry, also by Gen. Ames, who knew something of its fighting qualities while in the army of the James. The loss to the regiment was about 70, and among the killed was Lieut. S. S. Olney, of Co. F., whose loss to the regiment and company could not be made good. At about 8 o'clock, on the morning of 16 January, one of the magazines of the fort exploded, killing and wounding more of this regiment than the fighting of the day before.

From this time to the surrender of Johnson's rebel army, the 115th was continually employed in fighting, marching, picket and guard duty, until it reached Raleigh, N. C., where it was assigned to "safe guard" duty in the city, from 23 April to 17 June, when it was mustered out of service. On 19 June, the regiment left Raleigh for Albany, N. Y., where it was paid off by Paymaster C. F. Davis, on 6 July 1865 there being something less than two hundred of the original members. Upon leaving the U. S. Service, the men quietly returned to their homes and former vocations, and today the old 115th N. Y. Volunteer Infantry is represented in nearly every State in the Union, and almost every calling in life. However humble or exalted they may now be, if you speak of the camp, the bivouac, the fatigue, the march, the picket, the fight, and the campfires of years gone by, their eyes will kindle, and at the fireside they fight their battles o'er and o'er, until one could almost hear the roar of musketry, and the bursting of shells. But we must stop, for we can add nothing to the laurels already wreathed around the brow of one of the best of our country's defenders, the 115th Regiment, New York Volunteer Infantry. It only remains to add the following list of battles which were participated in by the regiment, or a part of it.

==== Battles in which the 115th NY Volunteer Infantry engaged ====
- Maryland Heights, Md., 13 September 1862
- Bolivar Heights, Va. 15 September 1862
- West Point, Va. 8 January 1863
- Jacksonville, Fla., 7 February 1864
- Camp Finegan, Fla., 8 February 1864
- Baldwin, Fla., 9 February 1864
- Sanderson, Fla. 11 February 1864
- Callahan Station, Fla., 14 February 1864
- Olustee, Fla., 20 February 1864
- Palatka, Fla., 18 March 1864
- Bermuda Hundred, Va., 5 May 1864
- Chesterfield Heights, Va., 7 May 1864
- Old Church, Va., 9 May 1864
- Weir Bottom Church, Va., 12 May 1864
- Drury's Bluff, Va., 14 May 1864
- Proctor's Creek & Port Walthall, Va., 16 May 1864
- Cold Harbor, Va., 1 June 1864
- Chickahominy, Va., 1 June 1864
- Petersburgh, Va., 23 June 1864
- Burnside Mine, Va., 30 July 1864
- Deep Bottom, Va., 16"2"8 August 1864 (?)
- Fort Gilmer, Va., 29 September 1864
- Darbytown Road, Va., 27 October 1864
- Fort Fisher, N.C., 25 December 1864
- Fort Fisher, N.C., 15 January 1865
- Fort Anderson, N.C., 19 February 1865
- Sugarloaf Battery, N.C., 20 February 1865
- Wilmington, N.C., 22 February 1865

The 115th brought out of the war six flags, which Col. Sammons, in behalf of the regiment, presented to the state. The national ensign, a gift of the ladies of the XVth Senatorial district, 20 August 1862, showed service, the staff and three-fifths of the flag being gone. The regimental banner, presented by the state authorities while the regiment was at Fonda, of silk, with eagle and shield in the center, the national motto in a scroll beneath, and thirty-four stars in the field above, bearing the inscription, "115th N.Y. Vol. Regiment Infantry," came out rent in the center and torn from side to side.

A second and similar regimental banner survived in better condition, and with it was a new national flag inscribed with the names of the regiment's battles; also two guidons of bunting. These flags were turned over to the adjutant general. They are represented by Lieut.-Col. N. J. Johnson, and are carried by Sergt. James English, who lost an arm while supporting them in the field.

Information cited from the Montgomery County, New York -Official Website - which was derived from "The History of Montgomery and Fulton Counties" by F.W. Beers, 1878.

== Sources ==
- Clark, James H. "The iron hearted regiment: being an account of the battles, marches and gallant deeds performed by the 115th Regiment N.Y. Vols. : also, a list of the dead and wounded, an accoubt of hundreds of brave men shot on a score of hard fought fields of strife, a complete statement of Harper's Ferry surrender, sketches of the officers, a history of the flags and those who bore them, together with touching incidents, thrilling adventures, amusing scenes, etc., etc., etc." Albany: J. Munsell, 1865. at the Internet Archive
- Silo, Mark. "The 115th New York in the Civil War: A Regimental History." Jefferson, NC: McFarland & Co. 2007.
