= Kathryn H. Starbuck =

American lawyer

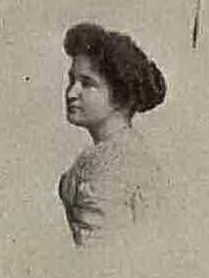
- Born: November 16, 1887
- Died: November 19, 1965 (aged 78)
- Occupation: Lawyer, suffragist

Kathryn Helene Starbuck (November 16, 1887 – November 19, 1965) was an American lawyer, suffragette, and law professor from New York.

== Life and legacy ==
Starbuck was born on November 16, 1887, in Saratoga Springs, New York, the daughter of Edgar D. Starbuck, a merchant and founder of E. D. Stark & Company, and Ella F. Martin. She had two younger brothers, and lived with one of them, Edgar, all her life.

Starbuck attended Saratoga Springs High School. graduated from Vassar College with an A.B. in 1911. She then went to Albany Law School, where she was a member of Phi Beta Kappa and graduated with an LL.B. in 1914. She spent the next year doing legal editorial work for the New York State Library in Albany, and in 1915 she was admitted to the state bar. She initially worked as chairman of the Women's Suffrage Committee in Saratoga County, and then became associated with the law firm Rockwood & McKelvey. In 1918, she moved to New York City and spent a year working with the law firm Rockwood & Lark. She also acted as vice chairman of the New York League of Women Voters at that time.

Starbuck was active in the women's suffrage movement since she was in college, when she made speeches and helped organize events in and around Saratoga Springs for the New York State Suffrage Association. She tried to gain support for the 1915 New York State Suffrage Amendment, becoming business manager of the Saratoga Springs Woman Suffragists and serving as a speaker and organizer on the issue all over the county. In 1916, she was the Saratoga County Assembly District Leader of the New York State Woman Suffrage Party. After New York women gained the right to vote in state elections in 1917, she began writing articles that taught women how to use their new right, encouraging them to read newspapers, discuss political issues, and attend lectures. In 1918, she ran for the New York State Assembly as a Democrat, running as "The Conservation Candidate" and campaigning to protect the Saratoga County natural resources. She lost the election to Republican Clarence C. Smith. In 1920, she became the first chairman of the Saratoga County League of Women Voters.

In 1918, Starbuck was one of the first women named to the Executive Committee of the New York State Democratic Committee. She remained an active member of the Democratic Party for the rest of her life. After 1920, she served on the Committee for the Uniform Laws for Women of the National League of Women Voters, and campaigned to allow women to serve on jury duty. She compiled a list of laws related to women and children as well as information on office holdings and occupation for Ida Husted Harper's History of Woman Suffrage, but the information wasn't included in the final draft.

In 1921, while conducting a private law practice and working as vice-president of her family's department store, Starbuck joined the newly-opened Skidmore College as Executive Secretary and Professor of Law. Among her administrative duties was Executive Secretary of the Skidmore College Alumnae Association for 18 years. She worked as Professor and Secretary for 33 years, retiring in 1954. She was elected to the Skidmore Board of Trustees immediately after her retirement, and she served on the board until her death. In 1953, Skidmore awarded her an honorary Doctor of Laws. Shortly after her death Skidmore dedicated the Kathryn H. Starbuck Center to her.

In 1937, Starbuck unsuccessfully ran as a delegate for the State Constitutional Convention. Under Governor Herbert Lehman, she headed the Woman's Advisory Commission of the State Department of Labor. She and other committee members resigned in 1943 when their recommendation for a bill guaranteeing equal pay for women was ignored. The bill was signed into law a year later, and she attended the bill's signing by Governor Thomas E. Dewey. During World War II, she urged women to participate in the war effort as program coordinator of the National Federation of Business and Professional Women's Clubs. In 1945, Governor Dewey appointed her to the New York State Woman's Council. In 1949, she was one of the ten women suggested to be sent to Germany as an advisor to help women adjust to the post-war environment.

Starbuck attended the First Baptist Church, where she taught a Sunday School class. She was considered an expert on international relations, speaking on the subject frequently and belonging to the American Association of International Law. She was a director of the Katrina Trask Alliance and the Yaddo Corporation. She was a member of the American Alumni Council, the Foreign Policy Association, the League of Nations Association, the National Municipal League, the New York State Bar Association, the American Bar Association, and the International Law Association. She was also a trustee of Vassar. In 1933, she joined the Saratoga Springs Board of Education. In 1939, she became President of the Board, the first woman to serve in the position.

Starbuck died in Saratoga Hospital on November 19, 1965. She was buried in Greenridge Cemetery.

In 2022, a National Votes for Women Trail marker was unveiled in Saratoga Springs commemorating Starbuck. The marker was placed outside a home on 11 Fifth Ave, which was the home Starbuck grew up in.
