= William Leete Stone Jr. =

American historical writer and journalist (1835–1908)

- Stone in 1891
- Born: April 4, 1835; New York City, U.S.
- Died: June 11, 1908 (aged 73); Mount Vernon, New York, U.S.
- Resting place: Greenridge Cemetery, Saratoga Springs, New York
- Education: Brown University (B.A., 1858); Albany Law School (LL.B., 1859)
- Occupations: Historical writer; journalist
- Known for: Works on the American Revolutionary War; History of New York City; Saratoga Monument Association
- Relatives: William Leete Stone Sr. (father)

William Leete Stone Jr. (4 April 1835 – 11 June 1908) was an American historical writer and journalist.

== Early life ==
Born in New York City, Stone was the only son of William Leete Stone Sr., also a historian of the American Revolutionary War. The son entered Brown University, but left college in 1856 and spent several months in Germany in acquiring a knowledge of the German language with a view of translating into English several military works bearing upon the history of the American Revolution. On his return in 1858, he graduated at Brown, and in 1859 took the degree of LL.B. at Albany Law School.

== Career ==
He practiced law at Saratoga Springs during 1860–63, and in 1864-67 was city editor of the New York Journal of Commerce. In 1870-74 he was editor and proprietor of the College Review, a paper published in the interests of American colleges. He served as secretary of the Saratoga Monument Association from its incorporation by the legislature of the state of New York in 1871, and was also one of its original trustees and incorporators. At the laying of the cornerstone of the monument on 17 October 1877, the centennial of Burgoyne's surrender, he delivered the historical address.

== Death ==
Stone died in Mount Vernon, New York.

== Works ==
- The Life and Times of Sir William Johnson, Bart. (2 vols., Albany, 1865) Volume 1 Volume 2
- Life and Writings of Col. William L. Stone (1866)
- Guide-Book to Saratoga Springs and Vicinity (1866)
- The Life and times of Sa-go-ye-wat-ha, or Red-Jacket (1866, with W.L.Stone, Sr.)
- Letters and Journals of Mrs. General Riedesel (1867)
- Life and Military Journals of Major-General Riedesel (1868)
- History of New York City (1872)
- Reminiscences of Saratoga and Ballston (1875)
- Campaign of General Burgoyne and St. Leger's Expedition (1877)
- Memoir of the centennial celebration of Burgoyne's surrender (1878)
- "History of the Saratoga Monument Association" (1879)
- Third Supplement to Dowling's History of Romanism (1881)
- The Orderly Book of Sir John Johnson (1882)
- The Journal of Captain Pausch, Chief of the Hanau Artillery during the Burgoyne Campaign (1886)
- Genealogy of the Stone Family (1887)
- Letters of Brunswick and Hessian officers during the American revolution (1891)
- "The Starin Family in America" (1892)
- Ballads of the Burgoyne Campaign (1893)
- Visits to the Saratoga battlegrounds, 1780-1880 (1895)
- Life of Governor George Clinton
