= Greenridge Cemetery =

Historic cemetery in Saratoga County, New York

Coordinates: 43°04′13″N 73°47′06″W

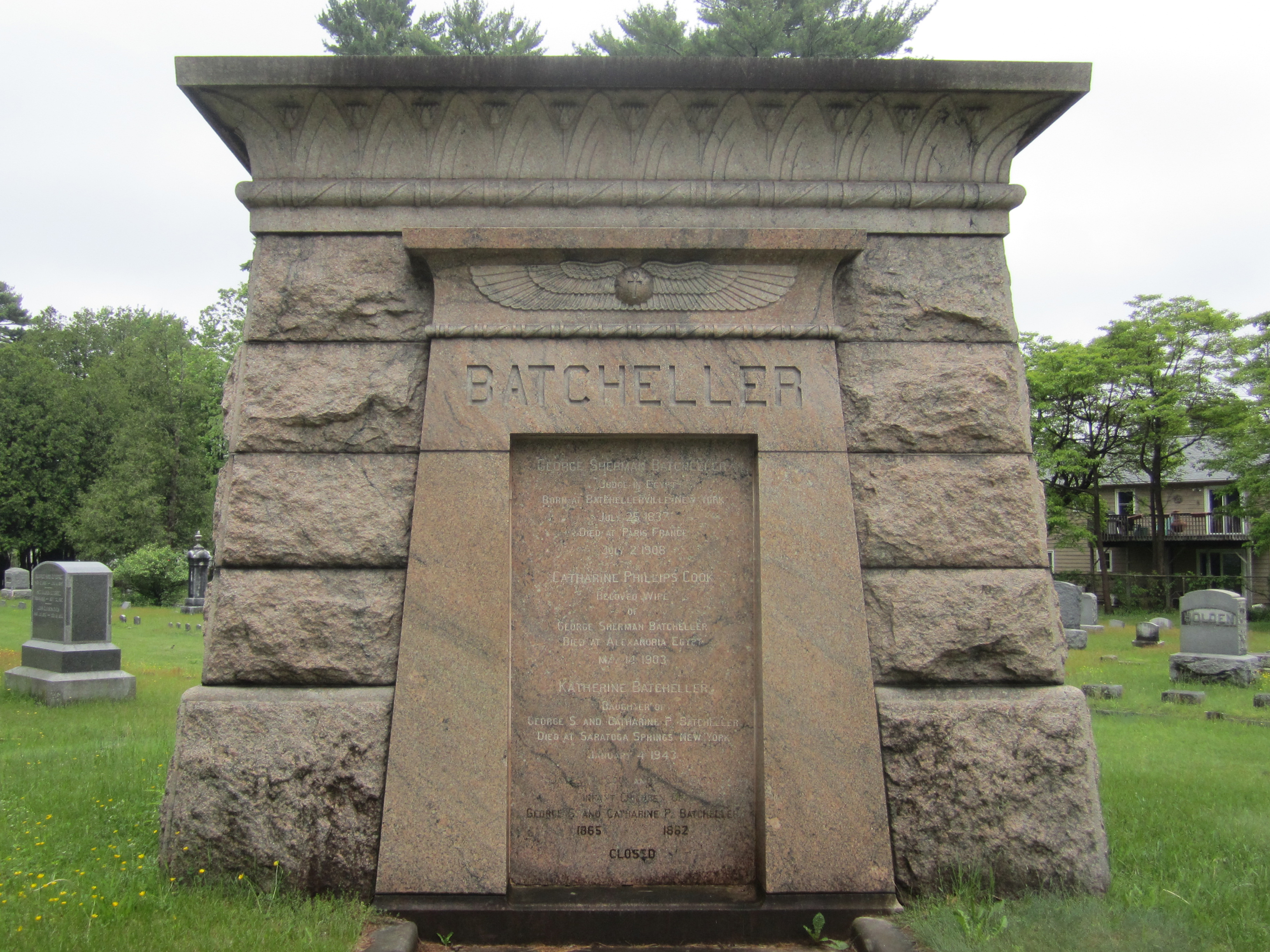
Mausoleum of George Sherman Batcheller, Greenridge Cemetery

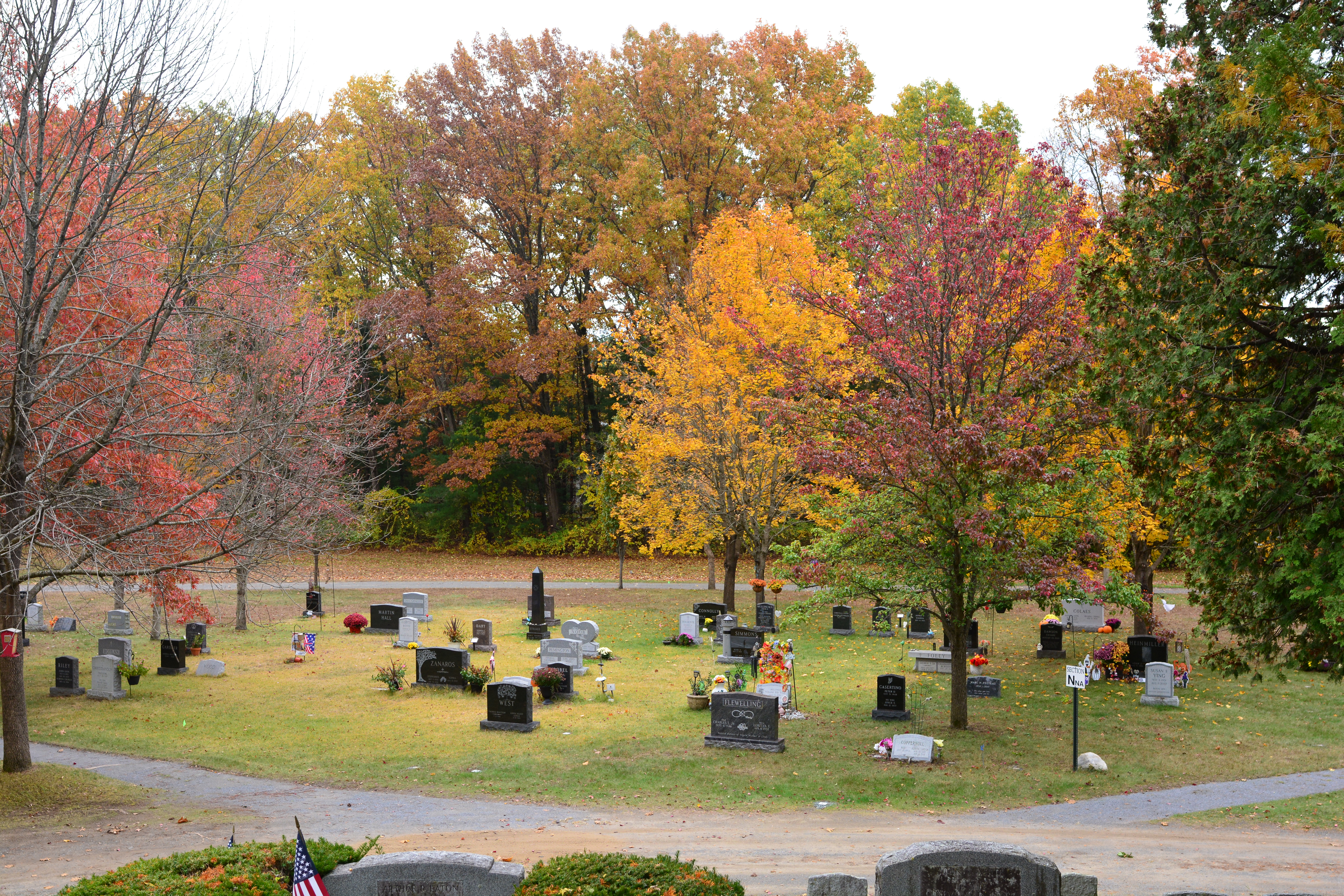
Greenridge Cemetery, 2025

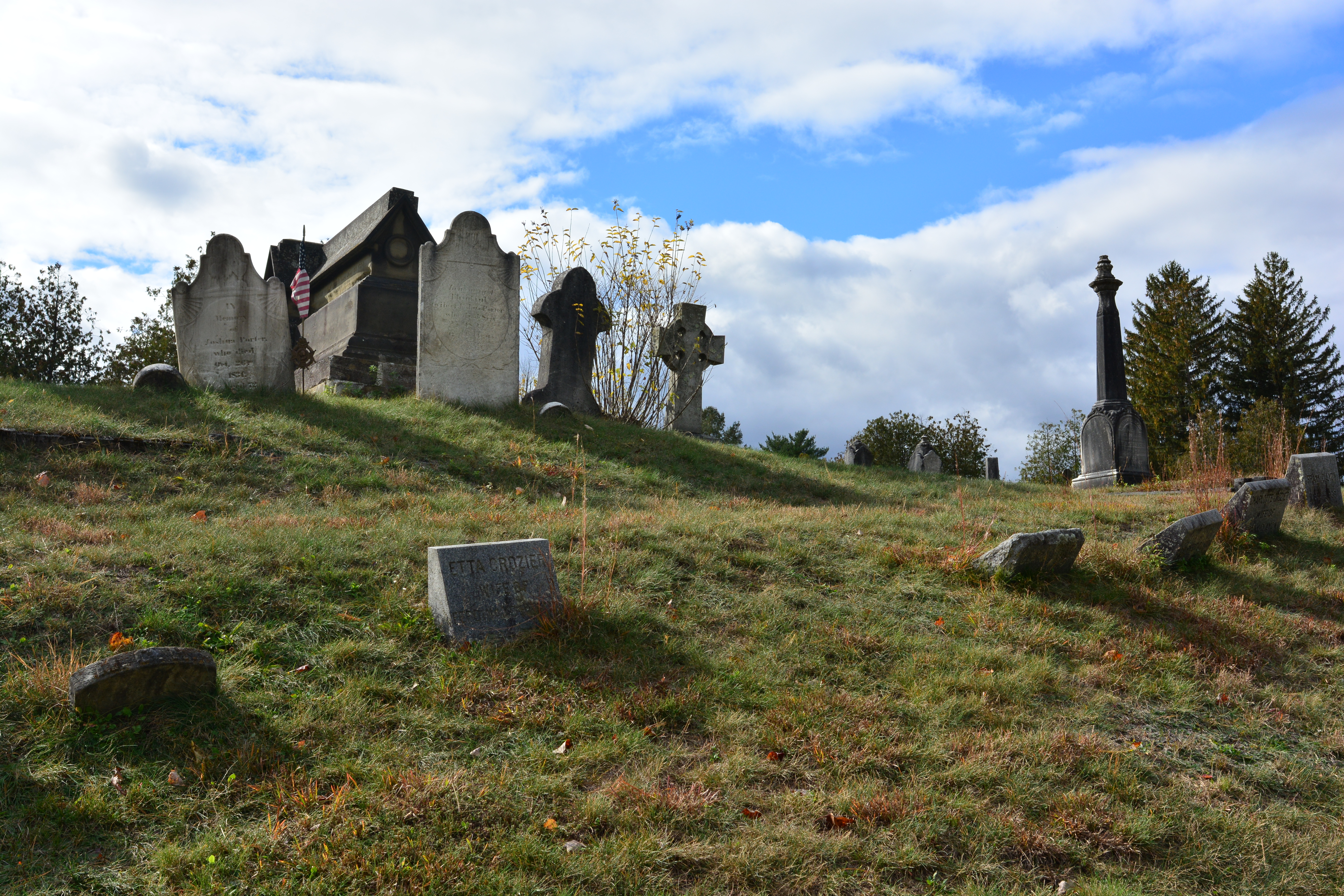
Greenridge Cemetery, 2025

Greenridge Cemetery is a historic cemetery in Saratoga Springs, New York, United States. It was established in 1844.

== Notable burials ==
- Seymour Ainsworth (1821–1890)
- George Sherman Batcheller (1837–1908)
- George S. Bolster (1913–1989)
- Charles Brackett (1892–1969)
- Edgar T. Brackett (1853–1924)
- Robert Newton Brezee (1851–1929)
- Nelson Cook (1808–1892)
- Ransom Cook (1794–1881)
- Clarence Dart (1920–2012)
- Lucretia Maria Davidson (1808–1825)
- Nicholas B. Doe (1786–1856)
- Charles F. Dowd (1824–1904)
- Lavelle Ensor (1900–1947)
- Henry H. Hathorn (1813–1887)
- Sam Hildreth (1866–1929)
- Tommy Luther (1908–2001)
- James M. Marvin (1809–1901)
- Lyman C. Pettit (1868–1950)
- Tabor B. Reynolds (1821–1901)
- William A. Sackett (1811–1895)
- Clarence C. Smith (1883–1983)
- Kathryn H. Starbuck (1887–1965)
- William Leete Stone, Jr. (1835–1908)
- William Leete Stone, Sr. (1792 or 1793–1844)
- Sylvester E. Veitch (1910–1996)
- Clarence A. Walworth (1820–1900)
- Ellen Hardin Walworth (1832–1915)
- Reuben H. Walworth (1788–1867)
- Ruby Walworth (1867–1898)
- Cornelius Vanderbilt Whitney (1899–1992)
- John Willard (judge) (1792–1862)
- Monty Woolley (1888–1963)
