= George Sherman Batcheller =

American soldier, politician, diplomat, and jurist

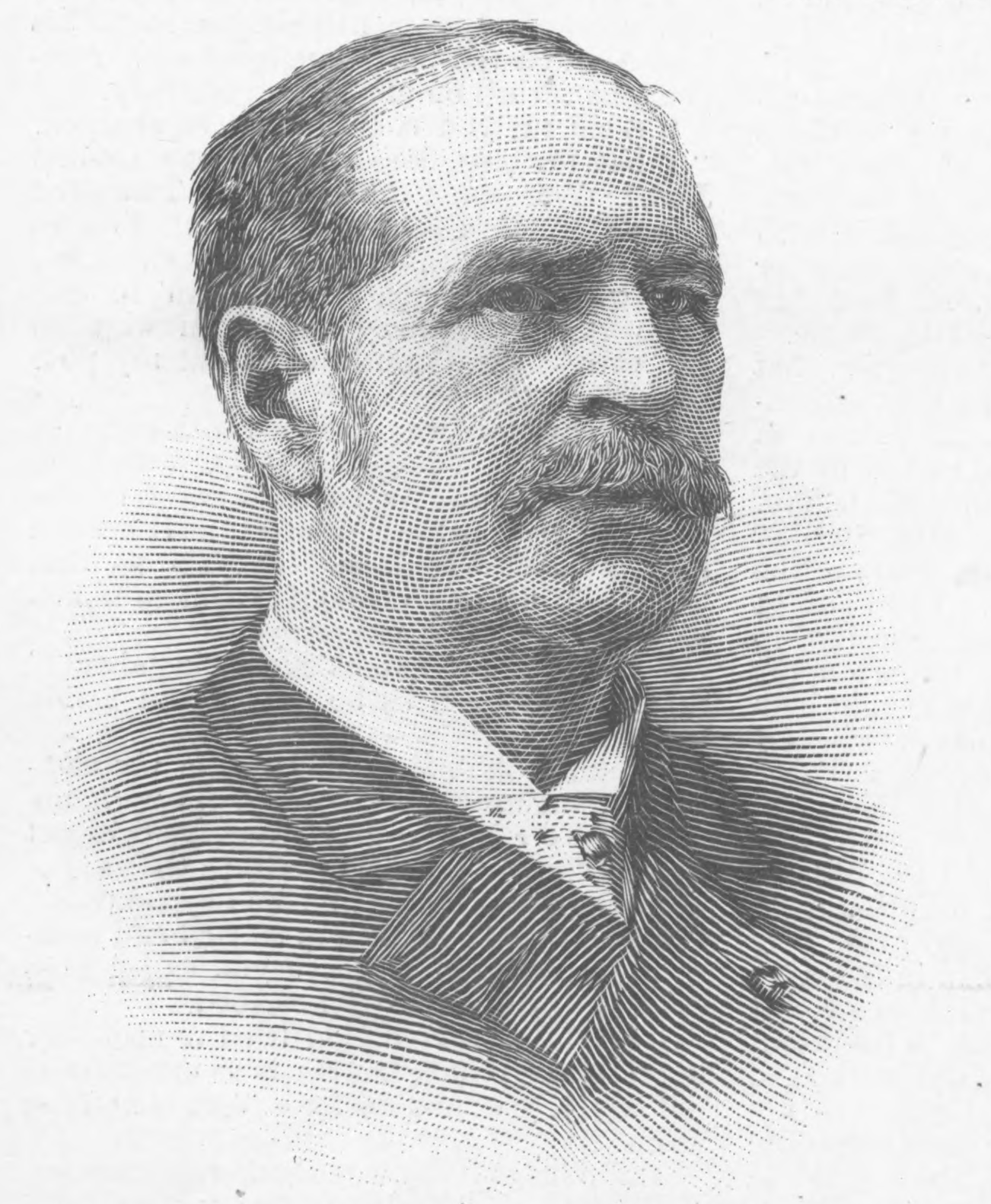
- Born: 25 July 1837
- Died: 2 July 1908 (aged 70)
- Occupation: Diplomat, politician, jurist, soldier

George Sherman Batcheller (July 25, 1837 – July 2, 1908) was an American soldier, politician, diplomat, and jurist.

== Personal life ==
Batcheller was born in Batchellerville, a small community in the town of Edinburg, New York named for his grandfather. His father was a nephew of Roger Sherman, a signer of the Declaration of Independence. Batcheller graduated from Harvard Law School in 1857 and was admitted to the New York bar in 1858. He entered politics as a Republican, and was a member of the New York State Assembly (Saratoga Co., 2nd D.) in 1859. At the time he was the youngest member of the Legislature.

On October 8, 1861, Batcheller married Catherine Phillips Cook, the daughter of James M. Cook of Ballston Spa, New York. The couple had three children: Anna Cady Batcheller (b.1862) and James M. Cook Batcheller (b.1865) both died in infancy. A daughter, Katharine Batcheller, was born on May 19, 1870 and died in Saratoga Springs on January 4, 1943.

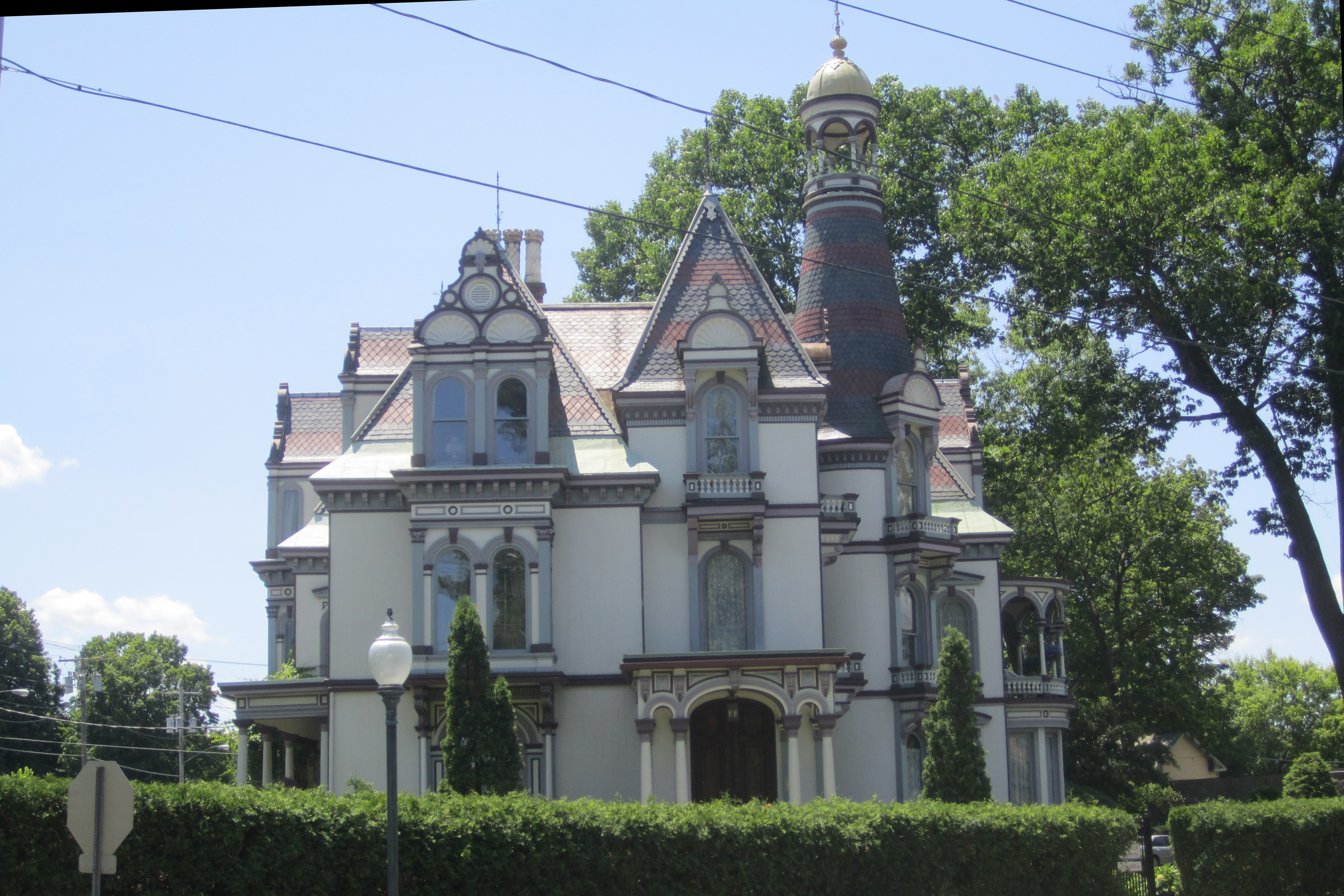
Batcheller Mansion, Saratoga Springs, New York, in 2013

In 1873, Batcheller constructed a mansion at 20 Circular Street in Saratoga Springs, New York. Designed by the architectural firm of Nichols and Halcott the mansion was a Victorian masterpiece combining French Renaissance Revival, Italianate and Egyptian architectural influences and cost $100,000 to build. Batcheller named the mansion Kaser-el-Nouzha, Arabic for palace of pleasure. The mansion's tower is suggestive of a minaret.

== Military service ==
At the outbreak of the Civil War "Batcheller raised a company of volunteers for the 115th New York Infantry Regiment, and was mustered in as lieutenant colonel of that regiment in August 1862." He participated in the operations in the Shenandoah Valley in September and October 1862, and was taken prisoner at the battle of Harpers Ferry in October. He was paroled and reportedly served with the 115th throughout the war, eventually receiving a promotion to brigadier-general. He "served in the 10th Army Corps as Deputy Provost Marshal General, Department of the South and participated in campaigns in Virginia and at Hilton Head and Charleston." He was one of the officers chosen to accompany the body of President Lincoln from Washington to Illinois.

== Government service ==
After the war Batcheller returned to practice law in Saratoga Springs. He was again a member of the State Assembly (Saratoga Co., 2nd D.) in 1873 and 1874. He then accepted an appointment from President Ulysses S. Grant as American Judge of the International Tribunal or "Mixed Courts" in Egypt. While serving as judge, he was called upon by the U.S. State Department to serve as prosecuting attorney in the 1880 murder trial of Stephen Mirzan, an American citizen who was accused of the sensational murder of an attorney general for the Egyptian government in Alexandria, Egypt. At the conclusion of the May 28-June 14, 1880 trial in Alexandria, Mirzan was convicted and sentenced to execution. The trial was controversial in the press because an American citizen was tried before the U.S. Minister to the Ottoman Empire without benefit of a jury. Moreover, in the absence of a U.S. attorney to try the case, Batcheller acted as prosecuting attorney, temporarily suspending his role as judge in the International Tribunal. In 1883, Batcheller was selected as Presiding Justice by his colleagues. He resigned this position in 1885, returned to Saratoga Springs, and was again a member of the State Assembly in 1886 and 1889. On April 1, 1889, he was appointed by President Benjamin Harrison as Assistant Secretary of the Treasury.

On October 1, 1890, he was appointed as U.S. Minister to Portugal, and arrived in Lisbon in December the same year. While he was serving in Portugal Mrs. Batcheller and their daughter Katharine were involved in a carriage accident. Mrs. Batcheller suffered severe injuries to her knee and left arm, which she was unable to use for over a year. Batcheller continued to serve on various diplomatic and commercial posts in Europe. In 1895, he presided over the 5th conference of the Universal Postal Union.

In 1898 the Egyptian Government requested that General Batcheller be reappointed to the International Tribunal. It was while he was serving in this office that Catharine died in Alexandria, Egypt on May 14, 1903.

Finally, in 1902 President Theodore Roosevelt appointed Batcheller a Justice of the International Court of Appeal in Alexandria.

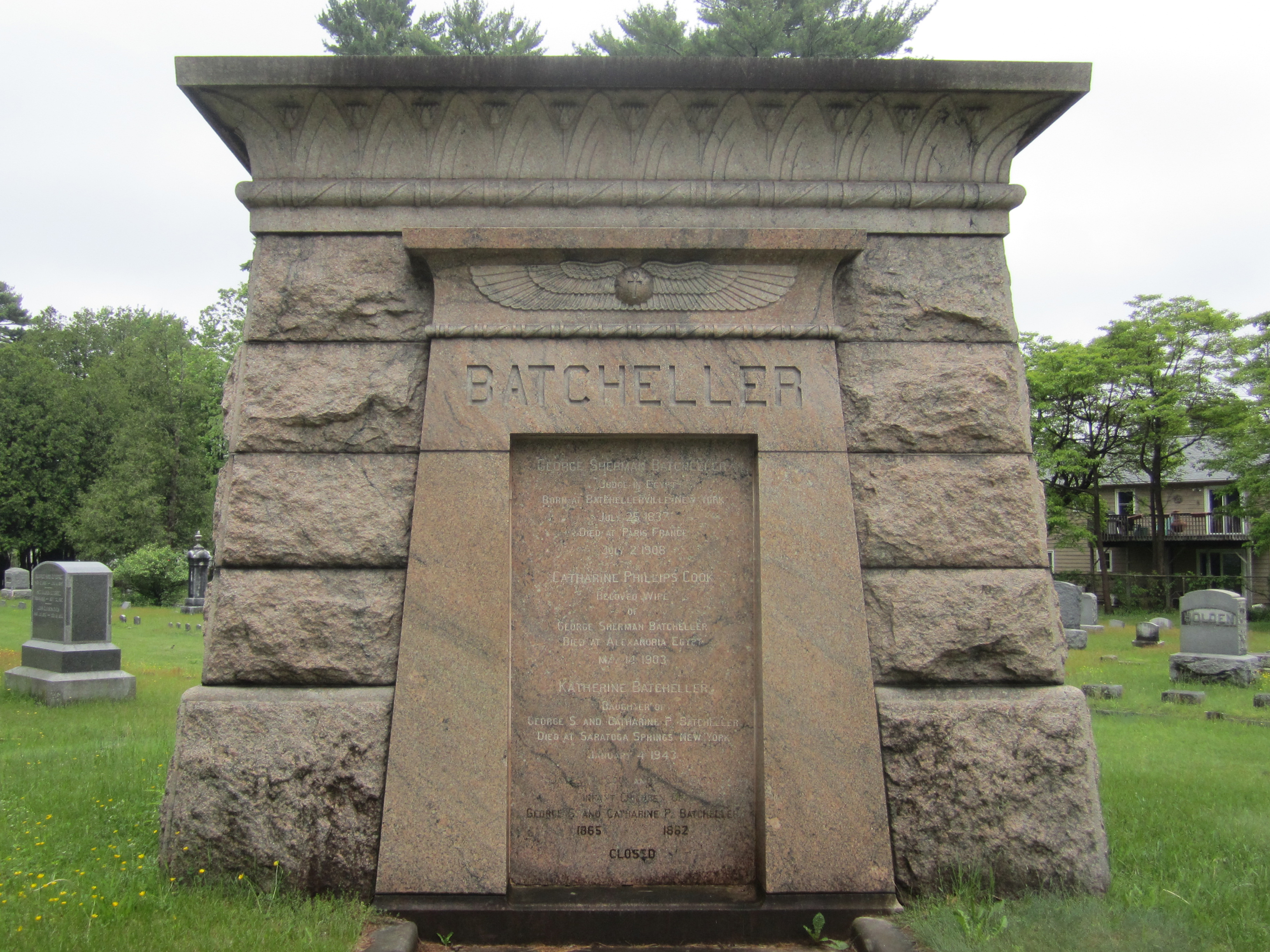
Batcheller Mausoleum, Saratoga Springs NY

George Batcheller died in Paris, France in 1908 of cancer of the mouth. The couple is buried in Greenridge Cemetery in Saratoga Springs with their children. The mausoleum, which resembles an ancient Egyptian mastaba tomb, was designed by the noted architect R. Newton Brezee.

New York State Assembly
Preceded by Tabor B. Reynolds	New York State Assembly; Saratoga County, 2nd District; 1859	Succeeded by Judiah Ellsworth
Preceded by Nathaniel M. Houghton	New York State Assembly; Saratoga County, 2nd District; 1873–1874	Succeeded by Nathaniel M. Houghton
Preceded by Bartlett B. Grippin	New York State Assembly; Saratoga County, 2nd District; 1886	Succeeded by Bartlett B. Grippin
Preceded by Bartlett B. Grippin	New York State Assembly; Saratoga County, 2nd District; 1889	Succeeded by Frank M. Boyce
Diplomatic posts
Preceded by George B. Loring	U.S. Minister to Portugal; 1890–1892	Succeeded by Gilbert A. Pierce
